= Forest management =

Branch of forestry

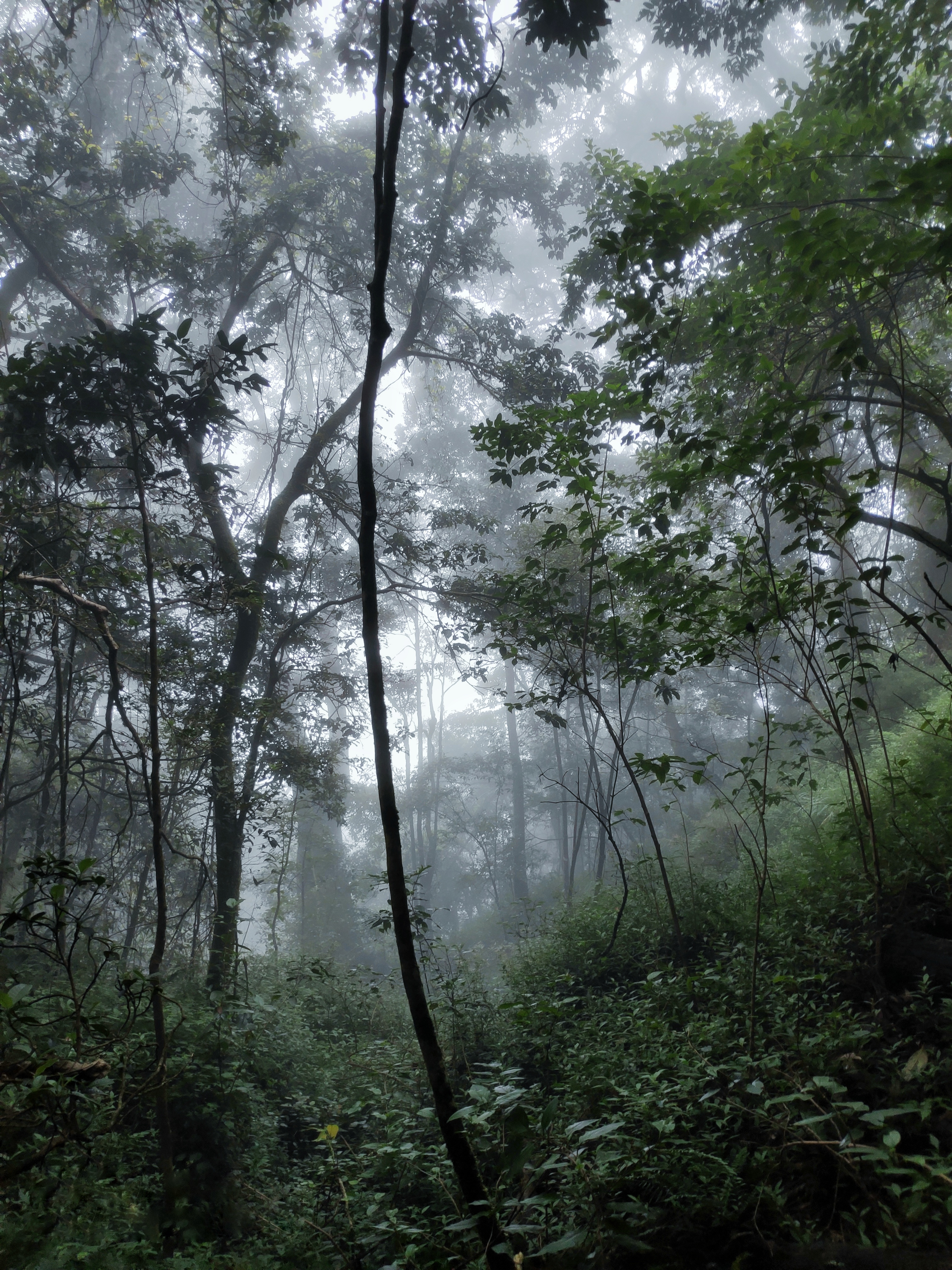
Sustainable forest management balances local socioeconomic, cultural, and ecological needs and constraints.

Forest management is a branch of forestry concerned with overall administrative, legal, economic, and social aspects, as well as scientific and technical aspects, such as silviculture, forest protection, and regulation. This includes management for timber, aesthetics, recreation, urban values, water, wildlife, inland and nearshore fisheries, wood products, plant genetic resources, and other forest resource values. Management objectives can be for conservation, utilisation, or a mixture of the two. Techniques include timber extraction, planting and replanting of different species, building and maintenance of roads and pathways through forests, and preventing fire. Forest Management plays an important part in maintaining ecosystem health and supporting biodiversity.

Many tools like remote sensing, geographic information systems (GIS), and photogrammetry have been developed to improve forest inventory and management planning. Scientific research plays a crucial role in helping forest management. Using these tools and research helps to make the best decisions about forest use and conservation. For example, climate modeling, biodiversity research, carbon sequestration research, GIS applications, and long-term monitoring help assess and improve forest management, ensuring its effectiveness and success. They are used to track the forest conditions and supporting the way they are managed.

== Role of forests ==
The forest is a natural system that can supply different products and services. Forests supply water, mitigate climate change, provide habitats for wildlife including many pollinators which are essential for sustainable food production, provide timber and fuelwood, serve as a source of non-wood forest products including food and medicine, and contribute to rural livelihoods. The working of a forest is influenced by the natural environment: climate, topography, soil, etc., and also by human activity. The actions of humans in forests constitute forest management.

== Aims ==
Some forests have been and are managed to obtain traditional forest products such as firewood, fiber for paper, and timber, with little thinking for other products and services. Nevertheless, as a result of the progression of environmental awareness, management of forests for multiple use is becoming more common.

Forests provide a variety of ecosystem services: cleaning the air, accumulating carbon, filtering water, and reducing flooding and erosion. Forests are the most biodiverse land-based ecosystem, and provide habitat for a vast array of animals, birds, plants and other life. They can provide food and material and also opportunities for recreation and education. Research has found that forest plantations "may result in reduced diversity and abundance of pollinators compared with natural forests that have greater structural and plant species diversity."

== Coverage ==
Globally in 2025, 1.20 billion ha of forest (29% of the total forest area) is managed primarily to produce wood and non-wood forest products. In addition, about 616 million ha of forest is designated for multiple use, which often includes production. The largest forest area designated for production is in Europe, at 548 million ha, which is more than half the region’s total forest area and almost half the total forest area designated for production globally. The area of forest designated primarily for production and multiple use worldwide decreased by 29.8 million ha and 97.5 million ha, respectively, between 1990 and 2025.

== Monitoring and planning ==
Proportion of total forest area worldwide designated for various primary management objectives, 2025.

Proportion of forest area with long-term management plans, by region, 2025.

Foresters develop and implement forest management plans relying on mapped resources, inventories showing an area's topographical features as well as its distribution of trees (by species) and other plant covers. Plans also include landowner objectives, roads, culverts, proximity to human habitation, water features and hydrological conditions, and soil information. Forest management plans typically include recommended silvicultural treatments and a timetable for their implementation. Application of digital maps in Geographic Information systems (GIS) that extracts and integrates different information about forest terrains, soil type and tree covers, etc. using, e.g. laser scanning enhances forest management plans in modern systems.

Forest management plans include recommendations to achieve the landowner's objectives and desired future conditions for the property subject to ecological, financial, logistical (e.g. access to resources), and other constraints. On some properties, plans focus on producing quality wood products for processing or sale. Hence, tree species, quantity, and form, all central to the value of harvested products quality and quantity, tend to be important components of silvicultural plans.

Good management plans include consideration of future conditions of the stand after any recommended harvest treatments, including future treatments (particularly in intermediate stand treatments), and plans for natural or artificial regeneration after final harvests.

The objectives of landowners and leaseholders influence plans for harvest and subsequent site treatment. In Britain, plans featuring "good forestry practice" must always consider the needs of other stakeholders such as nearby communities or rural residents living within or adjacent to woodland areas. Foresters consider tree felling and environmental legislation when developing plans. Plans instruct the sustainable harvesting and replacement of trees. They indicate whether road building or other forest engineering operations are required.

Agriculture and forest leaders are also trying to understand how the climate change legislation will affect what they do. The information gathered will provide the data that will determine the role of agriculture and forestry in a new climate change regulatory system.

In Sweden, where forest management is based on liberal governance principles, forest management plans primarily function as information tools that support decision-making by forest owners rather than as regulatory instruments. Studies have identified limitations in current planning systems, including outdated planning templates, a lack of harmonised data, and limited consideration of forest owners' objectives and broader ecological and social values.

=== Forest inventory ===
Forest inventory is the systematic collection of data and forest information for assessment or analysis. An estimate of the value and possible uses of timber is an important part of the broader information required to sustain ecosystems.

=== Wildlife considerations ===
The abundance and diversity of birds, mammals, amphibians and other wildlife are affected by strategies and types of forest management. Forests are important because they provide these species with food, space and water. Forest management is also important as it helps in conservation and utilization of the forest resources. Forest clearing to aid specific species of wildlife has been criticized because it can fragment forests leading to deleterious effects.

Approximately 50 million hectares (or 24%) of European forest land is protected for biodiversity and landscape protection. Forests allocated for soil, water, and other ecosystem services encompass around 72 million hectares (32% of European forest area). Over 90% of the world's forests regenerate organically, and more than half are covered by forest management plans or equivalents.

=== Management intensity ===
Proportion of forest area with long-term management plans, by region, 2020

Forest management varies in intensity from a leave alone, natural situation to a highly intensive regime with silvicultural interventions. Forest Management is generally increased in intensity to achieve either economic criteria (increased timber yields, non-timber forest products, ecosystem services) or ecological criteria (species recovery, fostering of rare species, carbon sequestration).

Most of the forests in Europe have management plans; on the other hand, management plans exist for less than 25 percent of forests in Africa and less than 20 percent in South America. The area of forest under management plans is increasing in all regions – globally, it has increased by 233 million ha since 2000, reaching 2.05 billion ha in 2020.

=== Monitoring ===
Long-term monitoring studies are conducted to track forest dynamics over extended periods. These studies involve monitoring factors such as tree growth, mortality rates, and species composition. By observing forest changes over time, scientists can assess the health of forests and their responses to environmental shifts. Long-term monitoring is invaluable for informing sustainable forest management practices. Yet such monitoring is usually of the type that provides "early warning" only, while a more valuable approach would be to combine long-term monitoring and long-term experiments, thereby revealing causality

Scientific research employs remote sensing technologies and geographic information systems (GIS) to monitor changes in forest cover, deforestation rates, and forest health over time. These tools provide valuable data for forest assessments and support evidence-based decision making in forest management and conservation. By remotely monitoring forest changes, scientists can respond more effectively to threats and challenges facing forests.

Researchers conduct biodiversity assessments to gain insights into the diversity and distribution of plant and animal species in various forest ecosystems. These studies are essential for identifying areas of high conservation value and understanding the ecological importance of different habitats. By studying biodiversity patterns, scientists can recommend targeted approaches to forest management that protect and promote the richness of forest life.

=== Effects of climate change on forests ===
Research explores the specific impacts of climate change on forest ecosystems, including extreme heat and drought events. Understanding these effects is vital for developing adaptive strategies to mitigate climate change impacts on forests. By recognizing the vulnerabilities of forests to changing climatic conditions, scientists can implement conservation methods that enhance their resilience.

Scientific research plays a crucial role in forest management by utilizing climate modeling to project future climate scenarios. These models help scientists understand potential changes in temperature, precipitation patterns, and extreme weather events, enabling them to assess the impact of these changes on forest ecosystems. By predicting climate trends, researchers can develop more effective strategies for forest management and conservation.

== Methods for creating or recreating forests ==
The term forestation is sometimes used as an umbrella term to include afforestation and reforestation. Both of those are processes for establishing and nurturing forests on lands that either previously had forest cover or were subjected to deforestation or degradation.

=== Tree breeding ===
Tree breeding is the application of genetic, reproductive biology and economics principles to the genetic improvement and management of forest trees. In contrast to the selective breeding of livestock, arable crops, and horticultural flowers over the last few centuries, the breeding of trees, with the exception of fruit trees, is a relatively recent occurrence.

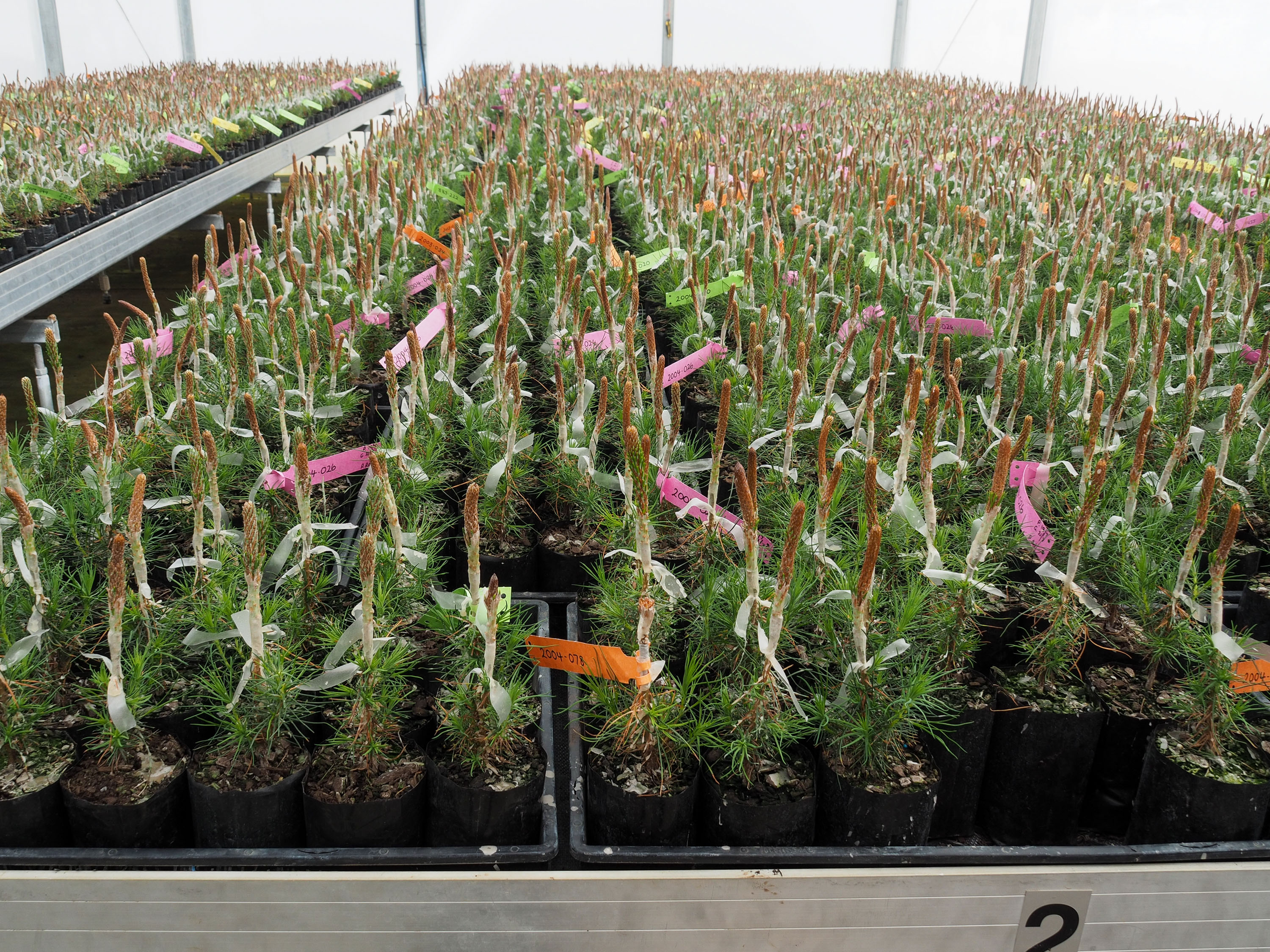
Pinus radiata grafts in preparation for the establishment of a seed orchard in New Zealand

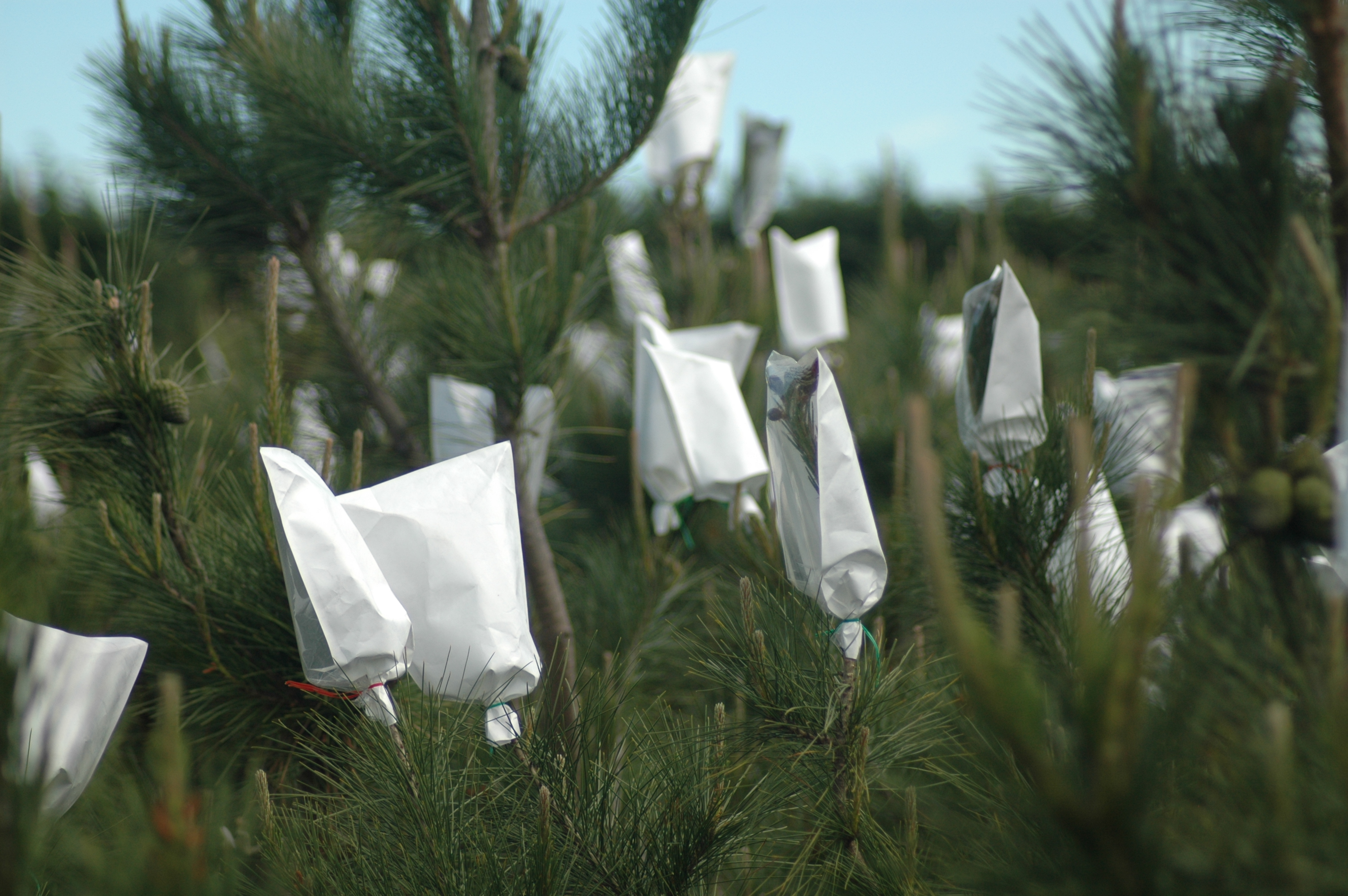
Isolation bags for controlled pollination in a Pinus radiata seed orchard.

A typical forest tree breeding program starts with selection of superior phenotypes (plus trees) in a natural or planted forest, often based on growth rate, tree form and site adaptation traits. This application of mass selection improves the mean performance of the forest. Offspring is obtained from selected trees and grown in test plantations that act as genetic trials. Based on such tests the best genotypes among the parents can be selected. Selected trees are typically propagated either by seeds or by grafting, and seed orchards are established when the preferred output is improved seed. Alternatively, the best genotypes can be directly propagated by cuttings or in-vitro methods and used directly in clonal plantations. The first system is frequently used for pines and other conifers, while the second is typical in some broadleaves (poplars, eucalypts and others). The objectives of a tree breeding program range from yield improvement and adaptation to particular conditions, to pest- and disease-resistance, wood properties, etc. Currently, tree breeding is starting to take advantage of the fast development in plant genetics and genomics.

=== Tree planting ===
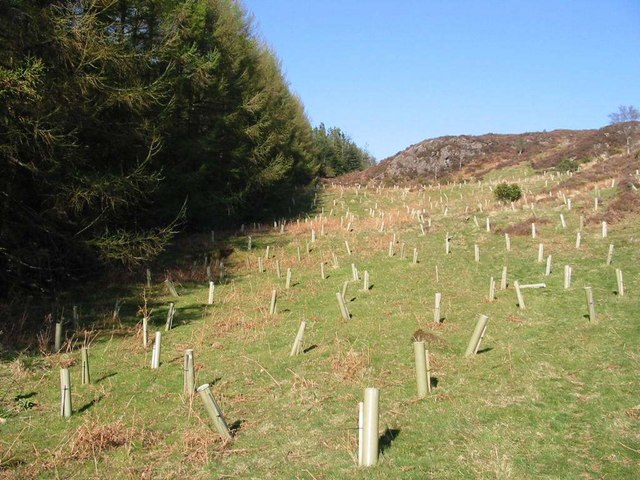
Tree planting is an aspect of habitat conservation. In each plastic tube, a hardwood tree has been planted.

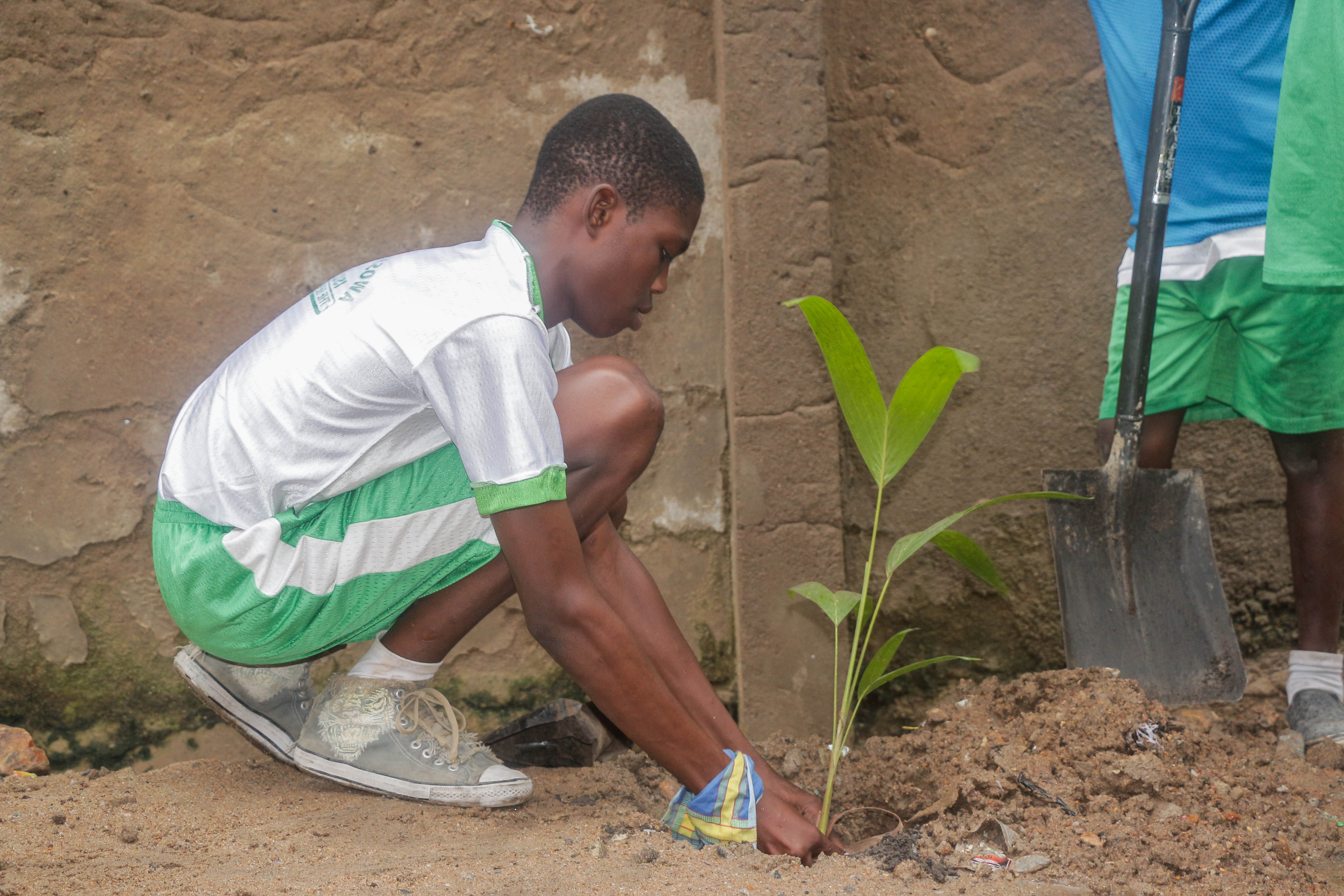
Tree planting in Ghana

Tree planting is the process of transplanting tree seedlings, generally for forestry, land reclamation, or landscaping purposes. It differs from the transplantation of larger trees in arboriculture and from the lower-cost but slower and less reliable distribution of tree seeds. Trees contribute to their environment over long periods of time by improving air quality, climate amelioration, conserving water, preserving soil, and supporting wildlife. During the process of photosynthesis, trees take in carbon dioxide and produce oxygen.

Because trees remove carbon dioxide from the air as they grow, tree planting can be used to help limit climate change. Desert greening projects are also motivated by improved biodiversity and reclamation of natural water systems, as well as improved economic and social welfare due to an increased number of jobs in farming and forestry.

=== Reforestation ===
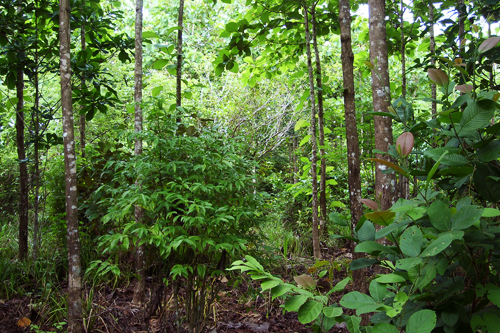
A forest, six years after reforestation efforts in Panama.

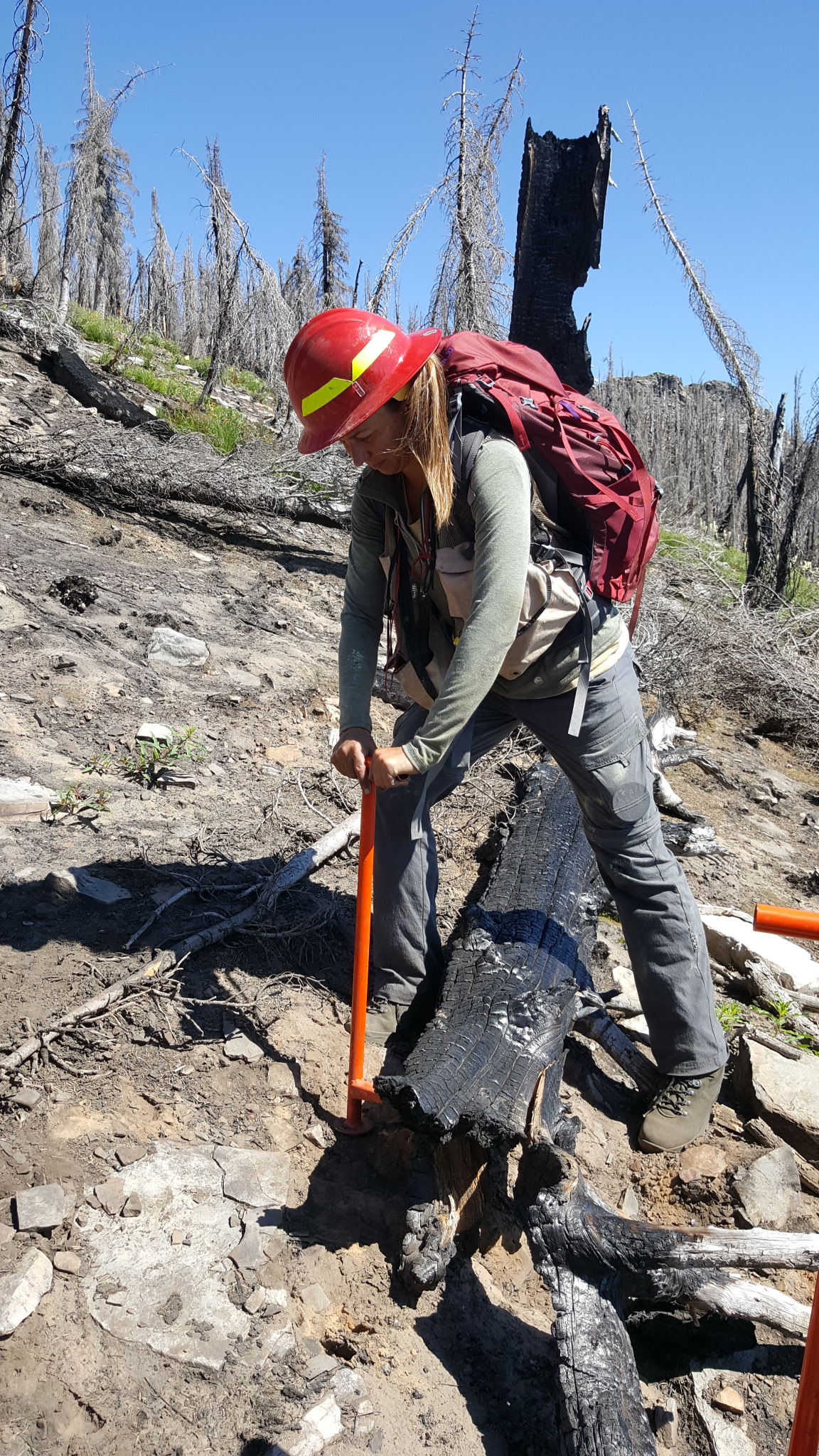
Reforestation in progress: Direct-sowing of seed in a burned area (after a wildfire) in the Idaho Panhandle National Forest, United States.

Reforestation is the practice of restoring previously existing forests and woodlands that have been destroyed or damaged. The prior forest destruction might have happened through deforestation, clearcutting or wildfires. Three important purposes of reforestation programs are for harvesting of wood, for climate change mitigation, and for ecosystem and habitat restoration purposes. One method of reforestation is to establish tree plantations, also called plantation forests. They cover about 131 million ha worldwide, which is 3% of the global forest area and 45% of the total area of planted forests.

Globally, planted forests increased from 4.1% to 7.0% of the total forest area between 1990 and 2015. Plantation forests made up 280 million ha (hectare) in 2015, an increase of about 40 million ha in the previous ten years. Of the planted forests worldwide, 18% of that area consists of exotic or introduced species while the rest consist of species native to the country where they are planted.

There are limitations and challenges with reforestation projects, especially if they are in the form of tree plantations. Firstly, there can be competition with other land uses and displacement risk. Secondly, tree plantations are often monocultures which comes with a set of disadvantages, for example biodiversity loss. Lastly, there is also the problem that stored carbon is released at some point.

The effects of reforestation will be farther in the future than those of proforestation (the conservation of intact forests). Instead of planting entirely new areas, it might be better to reconnect forested areas and restore the edges of forest. This protects their mature core and makes them more resilient and longer-lasting. It takes much longer − several decades − for the carbon sequestration benefits of reforestation to become similar to those from mature trees in tropical forests. Therefore, reducing deforestation is usually more beneficial for climate change mitigation than is reforestation.

Many countries carry out reforestation programs. For example, in China, the Three Northern Protected Forest Development Program – informally known as the "Great Green Wall" – was launched in 1978 and scheduled to last until 2050. It aims to eventually plant nearly 90 million acres of new forest in a 2,800-mile stretch of northern China. Such programs often blur the boundaries between reforestation and afforestation (the latter being the establishment of a forest in an area where there was no forest before).

==== Forest restoration ====
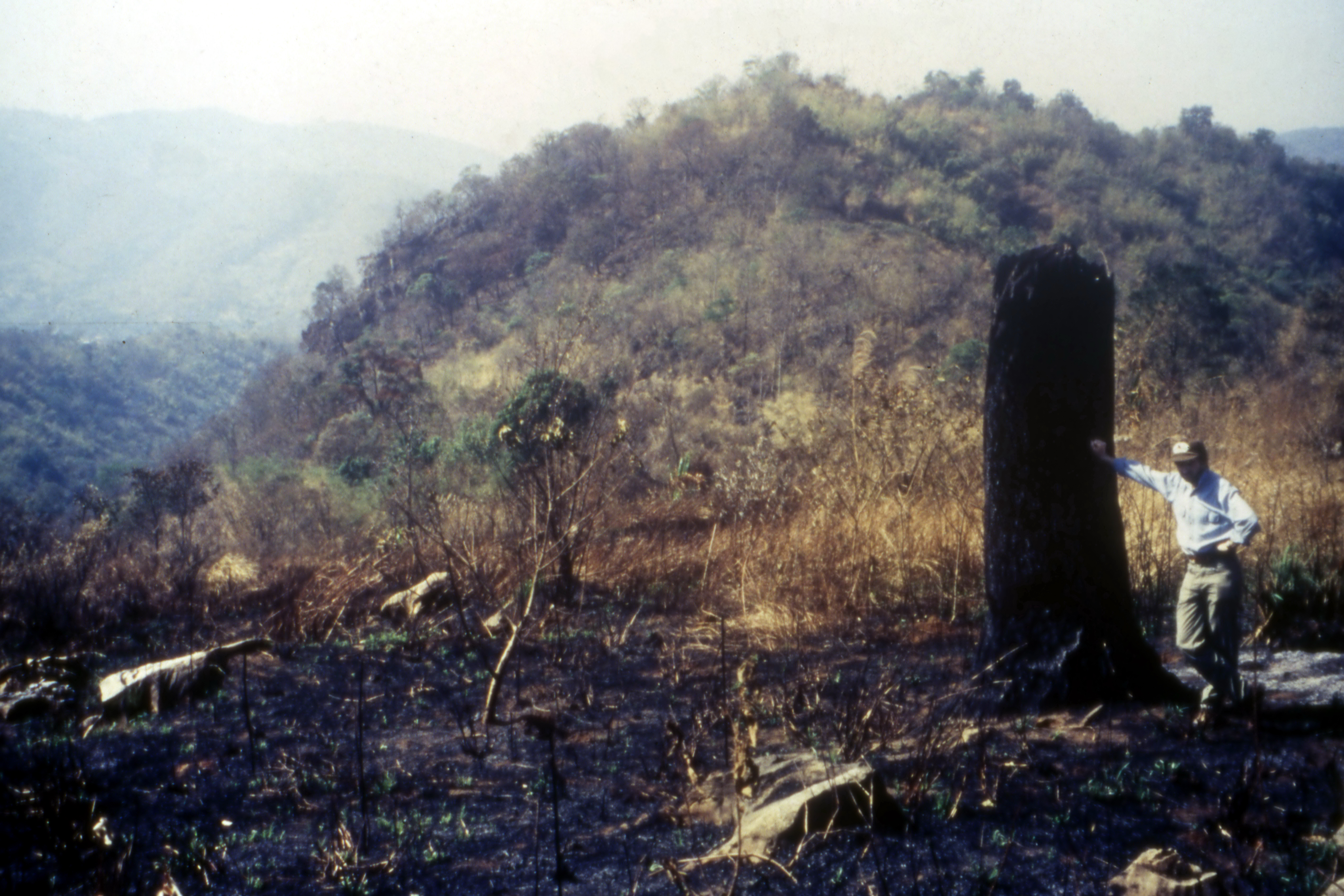
In the 1980s, conservation organizations warned that, once destroyed, tropical forests could never be restored. Thirty years of restoration research now challenge this: a) This site in Doi Suthep-Pui National Park, N. Thailand was deforested, over-cultivated and then burnt. The black tree stump was one of the original forest trees. Local people teamed up with scientists to repair their watershed.

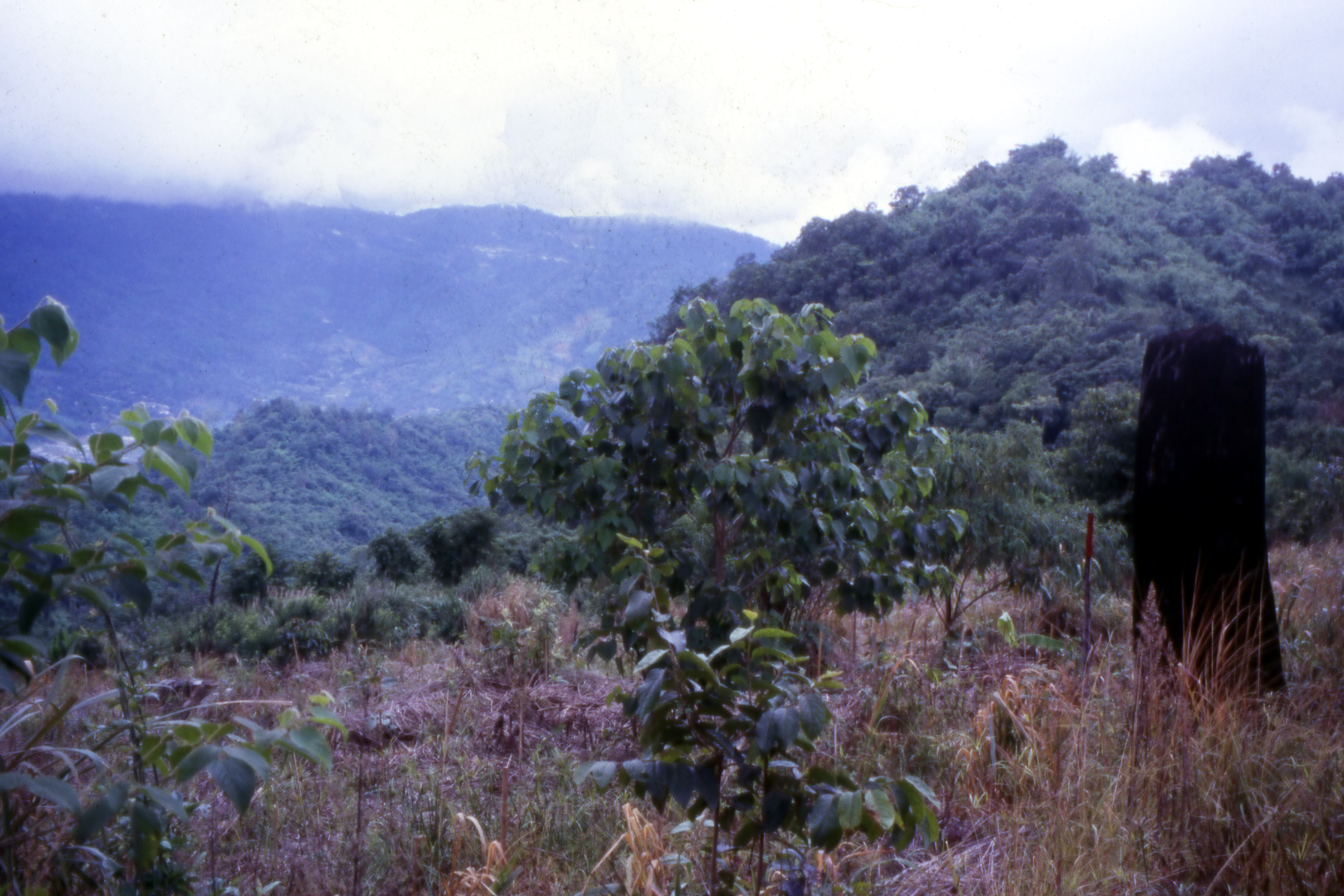
b) Fire prevention, nurturing natural regeneration and planting framework tree species resulted in trees growing above the weed canopy within a year.

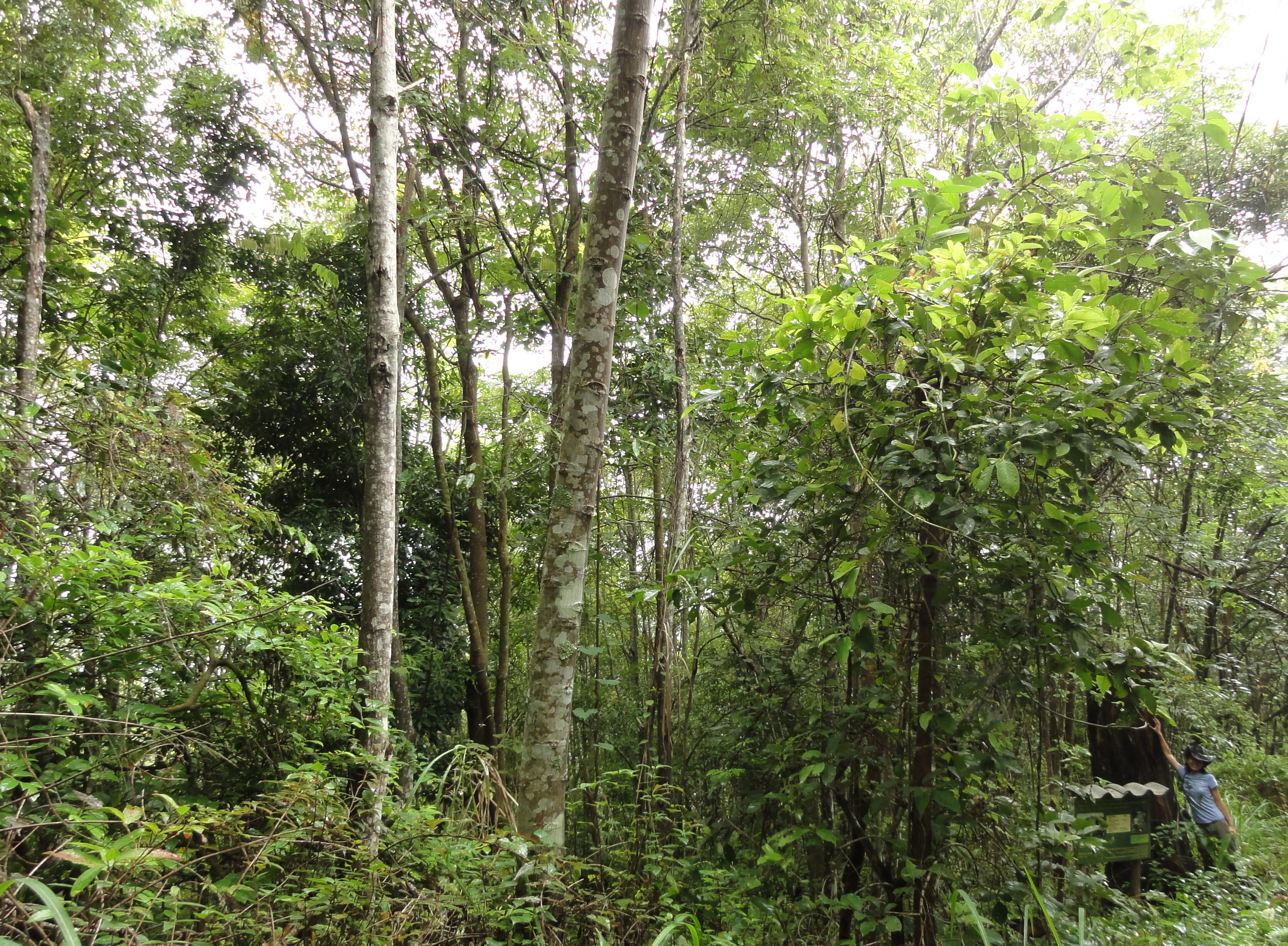
c) After 12 years, the restored forest overwhelmed the black tree stump.

Forest restoration is defined as "actions to re-instate ecological processes, which accelerate recovery of forest structure, ecological functioning and biodiversity levels towards those typical of climax forest", i.e. the end-stage of natural forest succession. Climax forests are relatively stable ecosystems that have developed the maximum biomass, structural complexity and species diversity that are possible within the limits imposed by climate and soil and without continued disturbance from humans (more explanation here). Climax forest is therefore the target ecosystem, which defines the ultimate aim of forest restoration. Since climate is a major factor that determines climax forest composition, global climate change may result in changing restoration aims. Additionally, the potential impacts of climate change on restoration goals must be taken into account, as changes in temperature and precipitation patterns may alter the composition and distribution of climax forests.

Forest restoration is a specialized form of reforestation, but it differs from conventional tree plantations in that its primary goals are biodiversity recovery and environmental protection.

Forest and landscape restoration (FLR) is defined as a process that aims to regain ecological functionality and enhance human well-being in deforested or degraded landscapes. FLR has been developed as a response to the growing degradation and loss of forest and land, which resulted in declined biodiversity and ecosystem services. Effective FLR will support the achievement of the Sustainable Development Goals. The United Nations Decade on Ecosystem Restoration (2021–2030) provides the opportunity to restore hundreds of millions of hectares of degraded forests and other ecosystems. Successful ecosystem restoration requires a fundamental understanding of the ecological characteristics of the component species, together with knowledge of how they assemble, interact and function as communities.

=== Afforestation ===
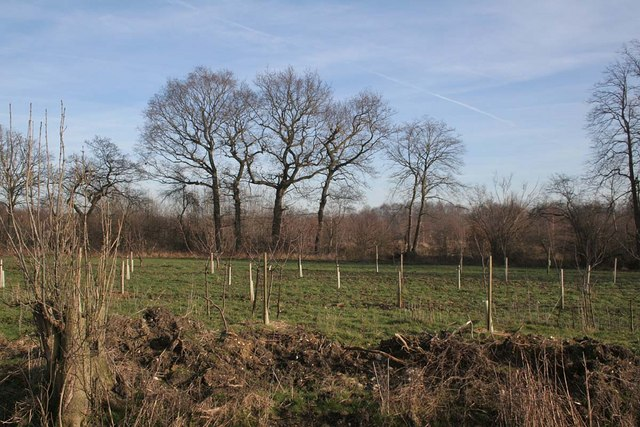
An afforestation project in Rand Wood, Lincolnshire, England (this patch was open ground before)

Annual afforestation

Afforestation is the establishment of a forest or stand of trees in an area where there was no recent tree cover. There are three types of afforestation: natural regeneration, agroforestry and tree plantations. In the context of climate change, afforestation can be helpful for climate change mitigation through the route of carbon sequestration. Afforestation can also improve the local climate through increased rainfall and by being a barrier against high winds. The additional trees can also prevent or reduce topsoil erosion (from water and wind), floods and landslides. Finally, additional trees can be a habitat for wildlife, and provide employment and wood products.

In comparison, reforestation means re-establishing forest that have either been cut down or lost due to natural causes, such as fire, storm, etc. Nowadays, the boundaries between afforestation and reforestation projects can be blurred as it may not be so clear what was there before at what point in time.

An essential aspect of successful afforestation efforts lies in the careful selection of tree species that are well-suited to the local climate and soil conditions. By choosing appropriate species, afforested areas can better withstand the impacts of climate change.

Earth offers enough room to plant an additional 0.9 billion ha of tree canopy cover. Planting and protecting them would sequester 205 billion tons of carbon which is about 20 years of current global carbon emissions. This level of sequestration would represent about 25% of the atmosphere's current carbon pool. However, there has been debate about whether afforestation is beneficial for the sustainable use of natural resources, with some researchers pointing out that tree planting is not the only way to enhance climate mitigation and CO_{2} capture. Non-forest areas, such as grasslands and savannas, also benefit the biosphere and humanity, and they need a different management strategy - they are not supposed to be forests.

Afforestation critics argue that ecosystems without trees are not necessarily degraded, and many of them can store carbon as they are; for example, savannas and tundra store carbon underground. Carbon sequestration estimates in these areas often do not include the total amount of carbon reductions in soils and slowing tree growth over time. Afforestation can also negatively affect biodiversity by increasing fragmentation and edge effects on the habitat outside the planted area.

Australia, Canada, China, India, Israel, United States and Europe have afforestation programs to increase carbon dioxide removal in forests and in some cases to reduce desertification.

== Types ==
=== Plantation forestry ===
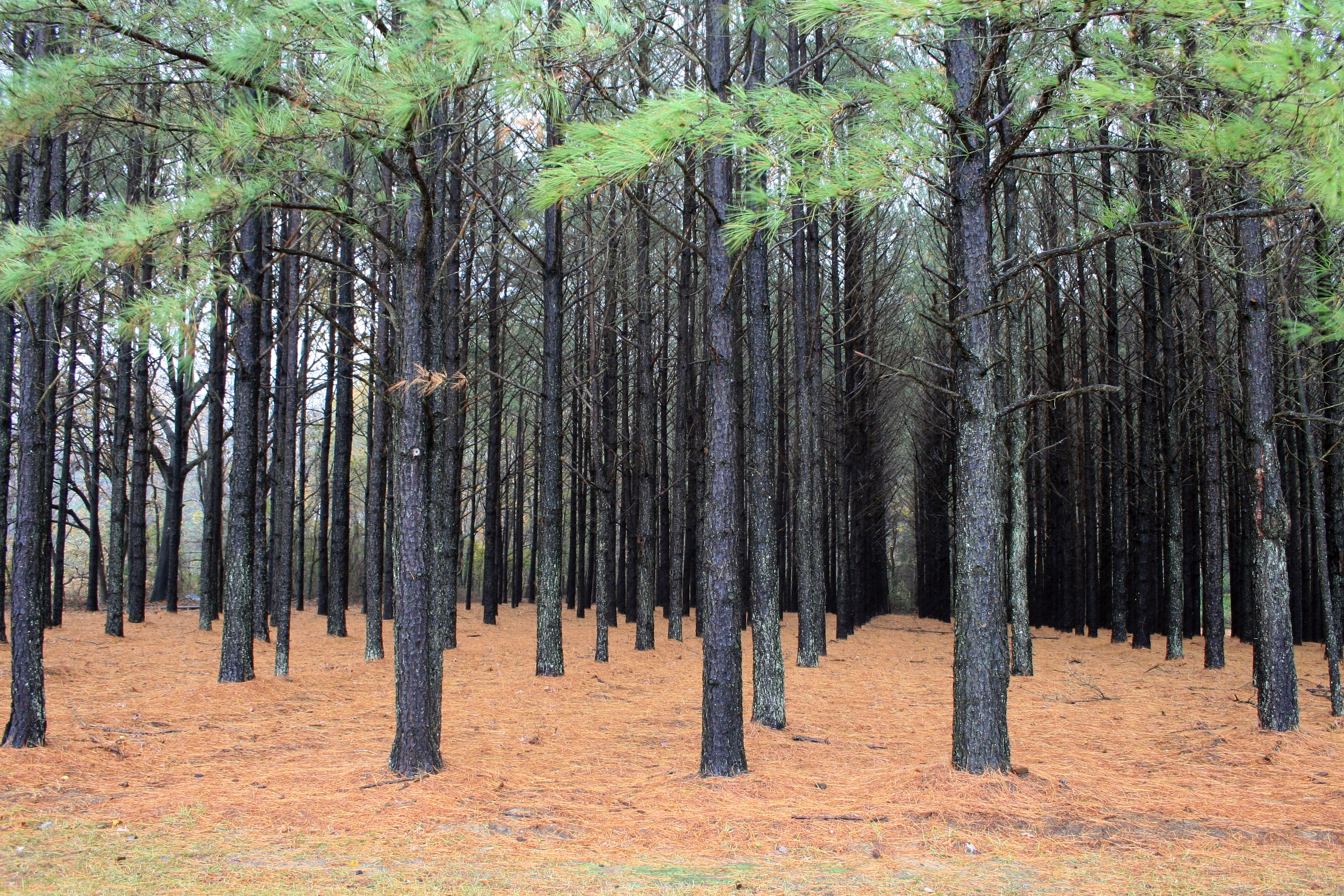
A pine plantation in the United States

A tree plantation, forest plantation, plantation forest, timber plantation, or tree farm is a forest planted for high volume production of wood, usually by planting one type of tree as a monoculture forest. The term tree farm also is used to refer to tree nurseries and Christmas tree farms. Plantation forestry can produce a high volume of wood in a short period of time. Plantations are grown by state forestry authorities (for example, the Forestry Commission in Britain) and/or the paper and wood industries and other private landowners (such as Weyerhaeuser, Rayonier, and Sierra Pacific Industries in the United States or Asia Pulp & Paper in Indonesia). Christmas trees are often grown on plantations, and in southern and southeastern Asia, teak plantations have replaced the natural forest.

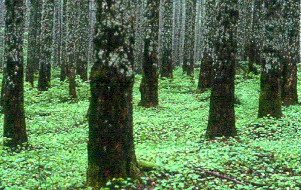
A plantation of Douglas-fir in Washington, U.S.

Industrial plantations are actively managed for the commercial production of forest products. Industrial plantations are usually large-scale. Individual blocks are usually even-aged and often consist of just one or two species. These species can be exotic or indigenous. The plants used for the plantation are often genetically altered for desired traits such as growth and resistance to pests and diseases in general and specific traits, for example in the case of timber species, volumic wood production and stem straightness. Forest genetic resources are the basis for genetic alteration. Selected individuals grown in seed orchards are a good source for seeds to develop adequate planting material.

Wood production on a tree plantation is generally higher than that of natural forests. While forests managed for wood production commonly yield between 1 and 3 cubic meters per hectare per year, plantations of fast-growing species commonly yield between 20 and 30 cubic meters or more per hectare annually; a grand fir plantation in Scotland has a growth rate of 34 cubic meters per hectare per year, and Monterey pine plantations in southern Australia can yield up to 40 cubic meters per hectare per year. In 2000, while plantations accounted for 5% of global forest, it is estimated that they supplied about 35% of the world's roundwood.

The highest share of plantation forest is in South America, where this forest type represents 99 percent of the total planted-forest area and 2 percent of the total forest area. The lowest share of plantation forest is in Europe, where it represents 6 percent of the planted forest estate and 0.4 percent of the total forest area. Globally, 44 percent of plantation forests are composed mainly of introduced species. There are large differences between regions: for example, plantation forests in North and Central America mostly comprise native species and those in South America consist almost entirely of introduced species.

=== Silviculture ===
Silviculture is the practice of controlling the growth, composition/structure, as well as quality of forests to meet values and needs, specifically timber production. The name comes from the Latin silvi- ('forest') and culture ('growing'). The study of forests and woods is termed silvology. Silviculture also focuses on making sure that the treatment(s) of forest stands are used to conserve and improve their productivity. The professional is known as silviculturist.

Generally, silviculture is the commercial business of growing and cultivating forest crops based on a knowledge of silvics, the study of the life history and general characteristics of forest trees and stands, with reference to local/regional factors. The focus of silviculture is the control, establishment and management of forest stands. The distinction between forestry and silviculture is that silviculture is applied at the stand-level, while forestry is a broader concept. Adaptive management is common in silviculture, while forestry can include natural/conserved land without stand-level management and treatments being applied.

=== Bamboo forestry ===
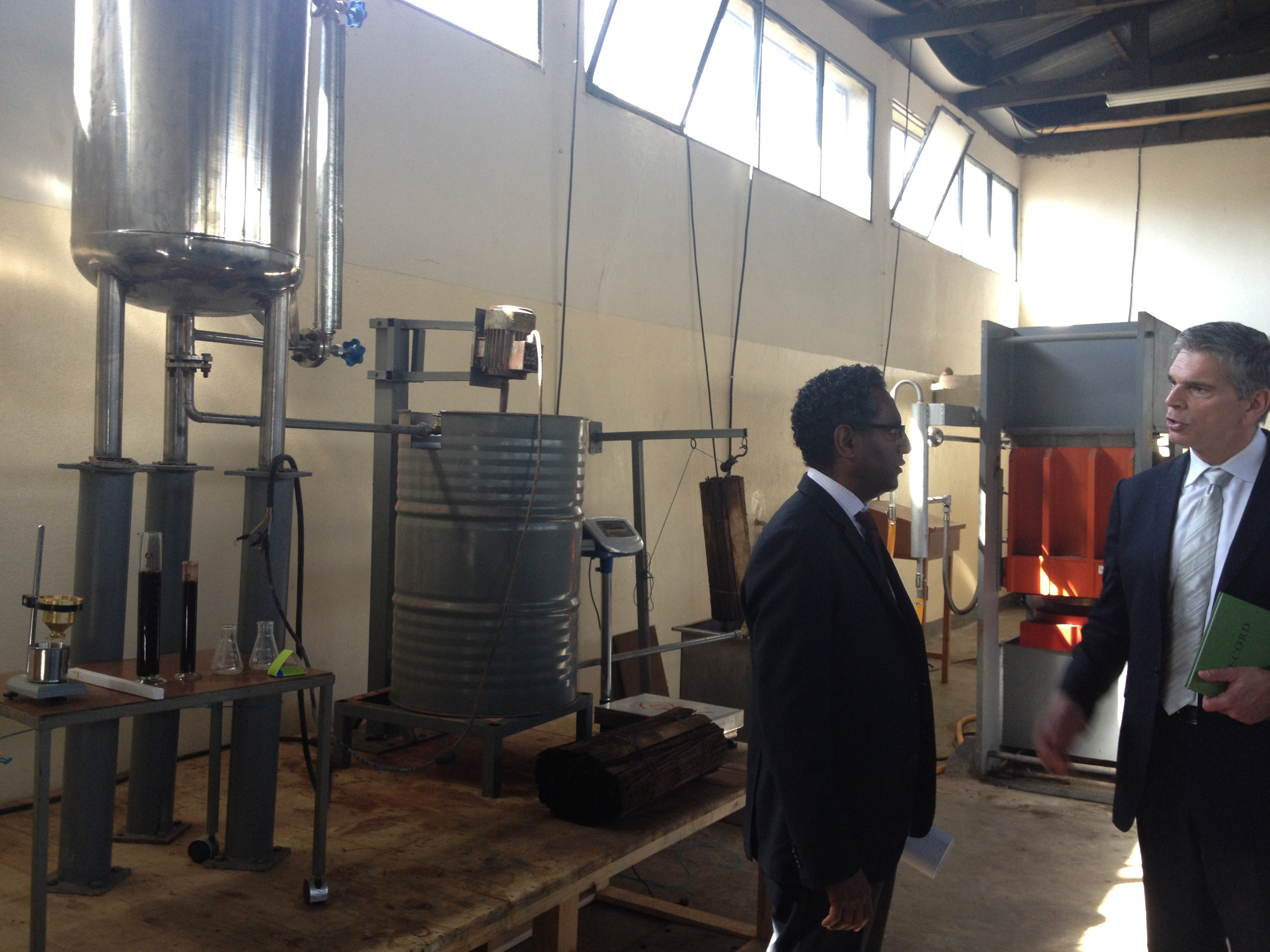
African Bamboo Product Innovation Lab where bamboo farming techniques and industrial uses are tested inside the company's facility in Addis Ababa, Ethiopia

Bamboo forestry (also known as bamboo farming, cultivation, agriculture or agroforestry) is a cultivation and raw material industry that provides the raw materials for the broader bamboo industry, worth over 72 billion dollars globally in 2019.

Historically a dominant raw material in South and South East Asia, the global bamboo industry has significantly grown in recent decades in part because of the high sustainability of bamboo as compared to other biomass cultivation strategies, such as traditional timber forestry. For example, as of 2016, the U.S. Fiber corporation Resource Fiber is contracting farmers in the United States for bamboo cultivation. Or in 2009, United Nations Industrial Development Organization published guidelines for cultivation of bamboo in semi-arid climates in Ethiopia and Kenya.

Because bamboo can grow on otherwise marginal land, bamboo can be profitably cultivated in many degraded lands. Moreover, because of the rapid growth, bamboo is an effective climate change mitigation and carbon sequestration crop, absorbing between 100 and 400 tonnes of carbon per hectare (40–160 tonnes per acre). In 1997, an international intergovernmental organization was established to promote the development of bamboo cultivation, the International Bamboo and Rattan Organisation.

Bamboo is harvested from both cultivated and wild stands, and some of the larger bamboos, particularly species in the genus Phyllostachys, are known as "timber bamboos". Bamboo is typically harvested as a source material for construction, food, crafts and other manufactured goods.

Bamboo cultivation in South, South East Asia and East Asia stretches back thousands of years. One practice, in South Korea, has been designated as a Globally Important Agricultural Heritage Systems.

=== Hardwood timber production ===
Hardwood timber production is the process of managing stands of deciduous trees to maximize woody output. The production process is not linear because other factors must be considered, including marketable and non-marketable goods, financial benefits, management practices, and the environmental implications, of those management practices.

The more biodiverse the hardwood-forest ecosystem, the more challenges and opportunities its managers face. Managers aim for sustainable forest management to keep their cash crop renewing itself, using silvicultural practices that include growing, selling, controlling insects and most diseases, providing manure, applying herbicide treatments, and thinning.

But management can also harm the ecosystem; for example, machinery used in a timber harvest can compact the soil, stress the root system, reduce tree growth, lengthen the time needed for a stand to mature to harvestability. Machinery can also damage the understory, disturbing wildlife habitat and prevent regeneration.

=== Energy forestry ===
Energy forestry is a form of forestry in which a fast-growing species of tree or woody shrub is grown specifically to provide biomass or biofuel for heating or power generation.

The two forms of energy forestry are short rotation coppice and short rotation forestry:

- Short rotation coppice may include tree crops of poplar, willow or eucalyptus, grown for two to five years before harvest.
- Short rotation forestry are crops of alder, ash, birch, eucalyptus, poplar, and sycamore, grown for eight to twenty years before harvest.

=== Forest farming ===
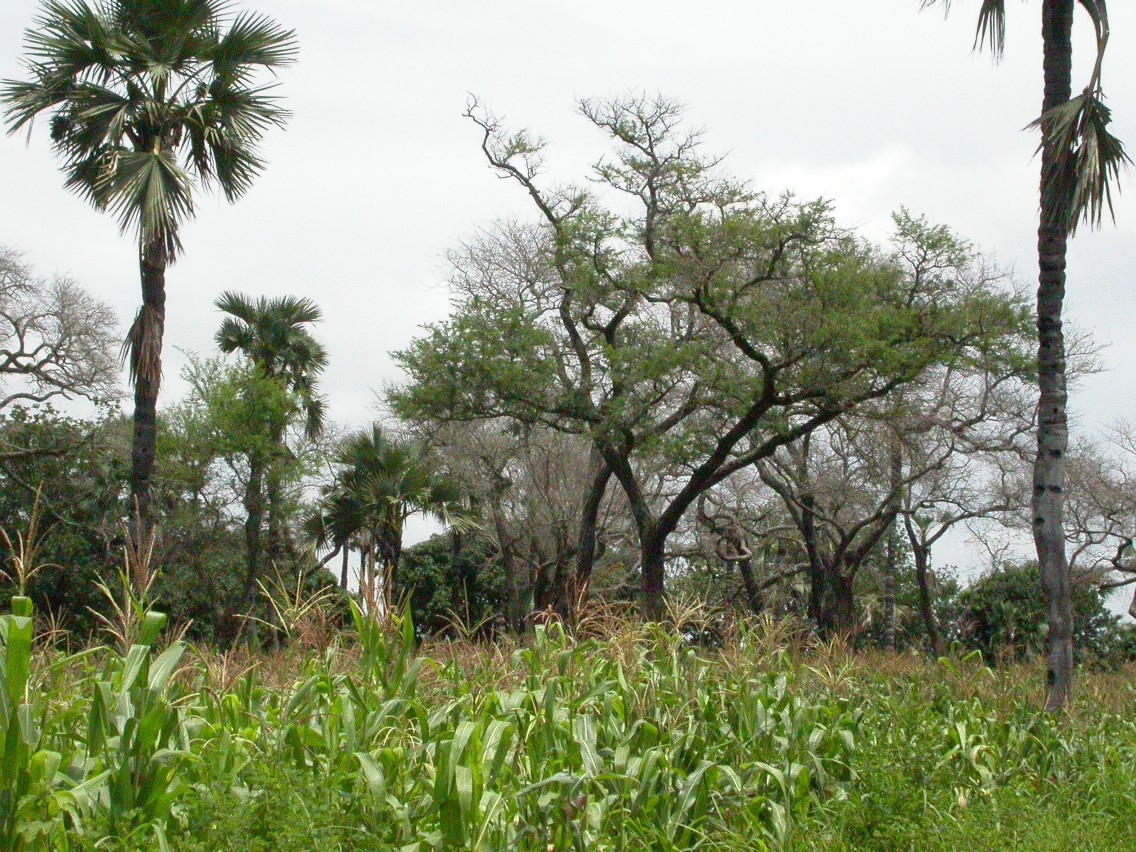
Maize grown under Faidherbia albida and Borassus akeassii near Banfora, Burkina Faso

Agroforestry (also known as agro-sylviculture or forest farming) is a land use management system that integrates trees with crops or pasture. It combines agricultural and forestry technologies. As a polyculture system, an agroforestry system can produce timber and wood products, fruits, nuts, other edible plant products, edible mushrooms, medicinal plants, ornamental plants, animals and animal products, and other products from both domesticated and wild species.

Agroforestry can be practiced for economic, environmental, and social benefits, and can be part of sustainable agriculture. Apart from production, benefits from agroforestry include improved farm productivity, healthier environments, reduction of risk for farmers, beauty and aesthetics, increased farm profits, reduced soil erosion, creating wildlife habitat, less pollution, managing animal waste, increased biodiversity, improved soil structure, and carbon sequestration.

Agroforestry practices are especially prevalent in the tropics, especially in subsistence smallholdings areas, with particular importance in sub-Saharan Africa. Due to its multiple benefits, for instance in nutrient cycle benefits and potential for mitigating droughts, it has been adopted in the US and Europe.

== Sustainable forest management ==
Sustainable forest management (SFM) is the management of forests according to the principles of sustainable development. Sustainable forest management must keep a balance between the three main pillars: ecological, economic and sociocultural. The goal of sustainable forestry is to allow for a balance to be found between making use of trees while maintaining natural patterns of disturbance and regeneration. The forestry industry mitigates climate change by boosting carbon storage in growing trees and soils and improving the sustainable supply of renewable raw materials via sustainable forest management.

Successfully achieving sustainable forest management provides benefits ranging from safeguarding local livelihoods to protecting biodiversity and ecosystems provided by forests, reducing rural poverty and mitigating some of the effects of climate change.

Sustainable forest management also helps with climate change adaptation by increasing forest ecosystems' resistance to future climatic hazards and lowering the danger of additional land degradation by repairing and stabilizing soils and boosting their water-retention capacity. It contributes to the provision of a wide range of vital ecosystem services and biodiversity conservation, such as wildlife habitats, recreational amenity values, and a variety of non-timber forest products. Conservation of biodiversity is the major management aim in around 13% of the world's forests, while preservation of soil and water resources is the primary management goal in more than 30%.

Feeding humanity and conserving and sustainably using ecosystems are complementary and closely interdependent goals. Forests supply water, mitigate climate change and provide habitats for many pollinators, which are essential for sustainable food production. It is estimated that 75 percent of the world's leading food crops, representing 35 percent of global food production, benefit from animal pollination for fruit, vegetable or seed production.

The "Forest Principles" adopted at the Earth Summit (United Nations Conference on Environment and Development) in Rio de Janeiro in 1992 captured the general international understanding of sustainable forest management at that time. A number of sets of criteria and indicators have since been developed to evaluate the achievement of SFM at the global, regional, country and management unit level. These were all attempts to codify and provide for assessment of the degree to which the broader objectives of sustainable forest management are being achieved in practice. In 2007, the United Nations General Assembly adopted the Non-Legally Binding Instrument on All Types of Forests. The instrument was the first of its kind that reflected the strong international commitment to promote implementation of sustainable forest management through a new approach bringing all stakeholders together.

The Sustainable Development Goal 15 is also a global initiative aimed at promoting the implementation of sustainable forest management.

The area of forest under management plans has increased in all regions since 1990; globally, it has grown by 365 million ha, reaching 2.13 billion ha, 55% of the total forest area in 2025 up from 50% in 2020 in 2025. Of the six regions, Europe has the highest percentage of forests under management plans, at 94%.

=== Definition ===
A definition of SFM was developed by the Ministerial Conference on the Protection of Forests in Europe (FOREST EUROPE) and has since been adopted by the Food and Agriculture Organization (FAO). It defines sustainable forest management as:

The stewardship and use of forests and forest lands in a way, and at a rate, that maintains their biodiversity, productivity, regeneration capacity, vitality and their potential to fulfill, now and in the future, relevant ecological, economic and social functions, at local, national, and global levels, and that does not cause damage to other ecosystems.

In simpler terms, the concept can be described as the attainment of balance: balance between society's increasing demands for forest products and benefits, and the preservation of forest health and diversity. This balance is critical to the survival of forests, and to the prosperity of forest-dependent communities.

For forest managers, sustainably managing a particular forest tract means determining, in a tangible way, how to use it today to ensure similar benefits, health and productivity in the future. Forest managers must assess and integrate a wide array of sometimes conflicting factors: commercial and non-commercial values, environmental considerations, community needs, even global impact to produce sound forest plans. In most cases, forest managers develop their forest plans in consultation with citizens, businesses, organizations and other interested parties in and around the forest tract being managed. The tools and visualization have been recently evolving for better management practices.

The Food and Agriculture Organization of the United Nations, at the request of Member States, developed and launched the Sustainable Forest Management Toolbox in 2014, an online collection of tools, best practices and examples of their application to support countries implementing sustainable forest management.

Because forests and societies are in constant flux, the desired outcome of sustainable forest management is not a fixed one. What constitutes a sustainably managed forest will change over time as values held by the public change.

=== Criteria and indicators ===
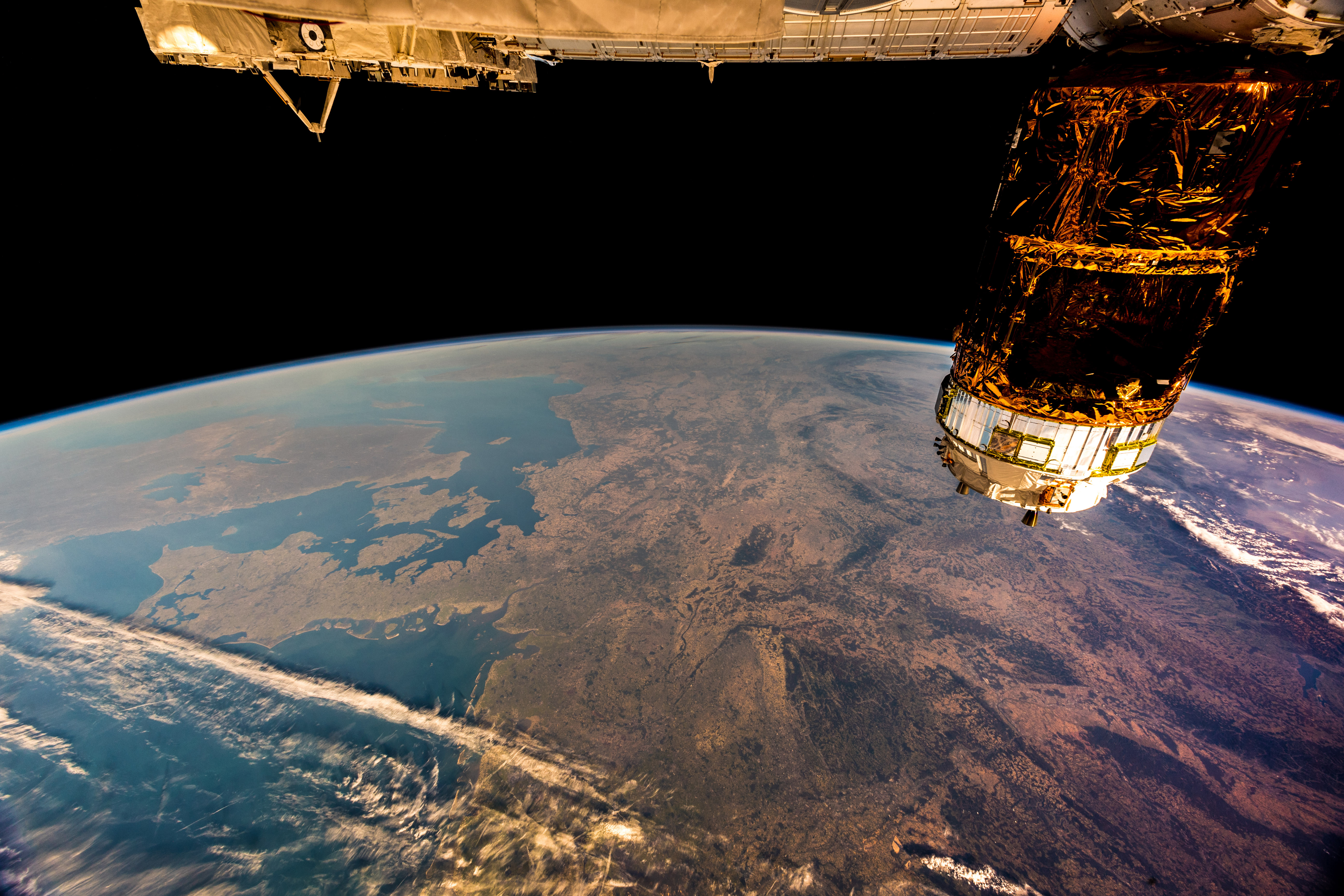
Deforestation in Europe, 2020. France is the most deforested country in Europe, with only 15% of the native vegetation remaining.

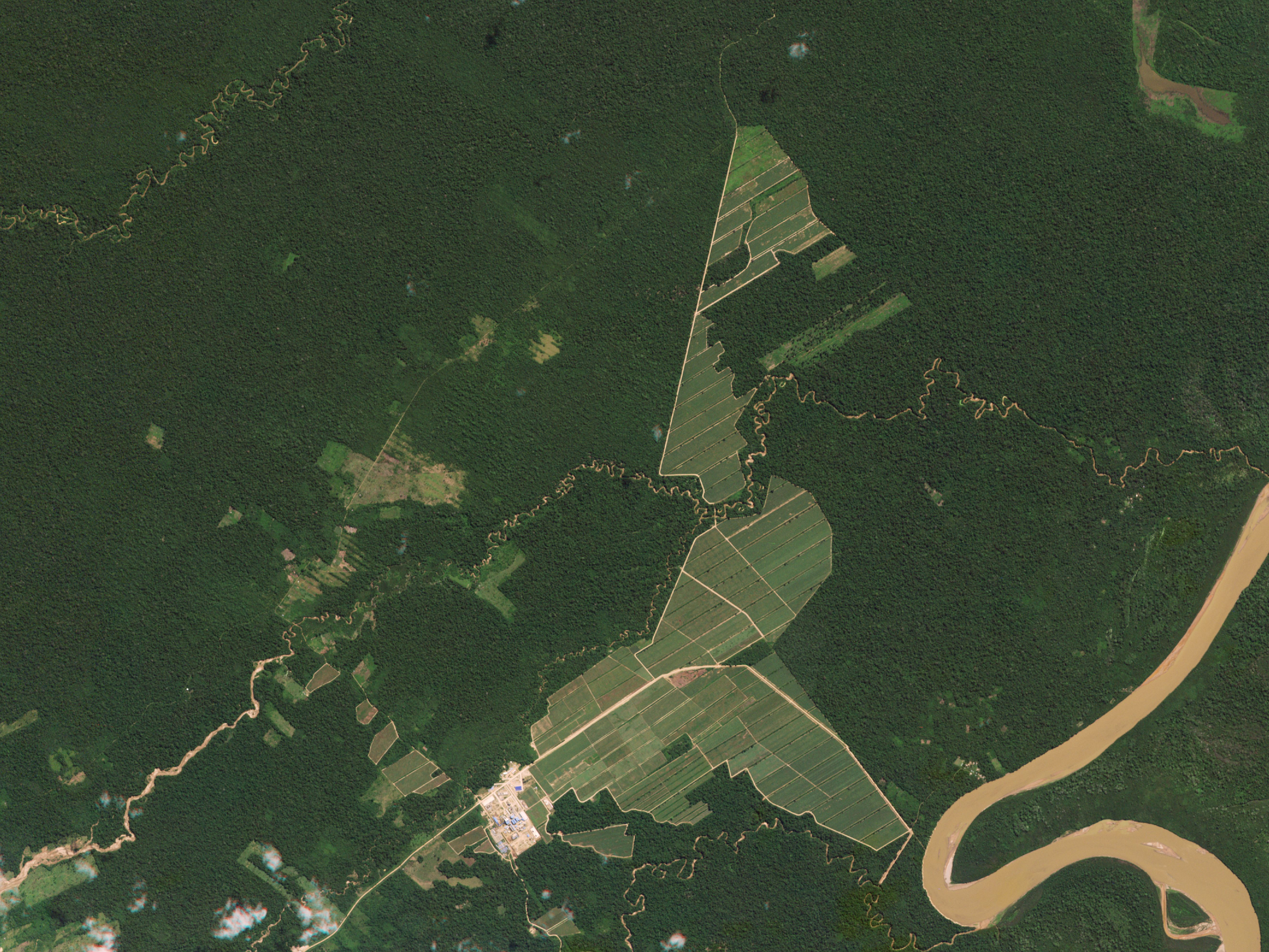
Deforestation in Bolivia.

Criteria and indicators are tools which can be used to conceptualise, evaluate and implement sustainable forest management. Criteria define and characterize the essential elements, as well as a set of conditions or processes, by which sustainable forest management may be assessed. Periodically measured indicators reveal the direction of change with respect to each criterion.

Criteria and indicators of sustainable forest management are widely used and many countries produce national reports that assess their progress toward sustainable forest management. There are nine international and regional criteria and indicators initiatives, which collectively involve more than 150 countries. Three of the more advanced initiatives are those of the Working Group on Criteria and Indicators for the Conservation and Sustainable Management of Temperate and Boreal Forests (also called the Montréal Process), Forest Europe, and the International Tropical Timber Organization. Countries who are members of the same initiative usually agree to produce reports at the same time and using the same indicators. Within countries, at the management unit level, efforts have also been directed at developing local level criteria and indicators of sustainable forest management. The Center for International Forestry Research, the International Model Forest Network and researchers at the University of British Columbia have developed a number of tools and techniques to help forest-dependent communities develop their own local level criteria and indicators. Criteria and Indicators also form the basis of third-party forest certification programs such as the Canadian Standards Association's Sustainable Forest Management Standards and the Sustainable Forestry Initiative.

There appears to be growing international consensus on the key elements of sustainable forest management. Seven common thematic areas of sustainable forest management have emerged based on the criteria of the nine ongoing regional and international criteria and indicators initiatives. The seven thematic areas are:

- Extent of forest resources
- Biological diversity
- Forest health and vitality
- Productive functions of forest resources
- Protective functions of forest resources
- Socio-economic functions
- Legal, policy and institutional framework.

This consensus on common thematic areas (or criteria) effectively provides a common and implicit definition of sustainable forest management. The seven thematic areas were acknowledged by the international forest community at the fourth session of the United Nations Forum on Forests and the 16th session of the Committee on Forestry. These thematic areas have since been enshrined in the Non-Legally Binding Instrument on All Types of Forests as a reference framework for sustainable forest management to help achieve the purpose of the instrument.

In 2012, the Montréal Process, Forest Europe, the International Tropical Timber Organization, and the Food and Agriculture Organization of the United Nations, acknowledging the seven thematic areas, endorsed a joint statement of collaboration to improve global forest-related data collection and reporting and avoiding the proliferation of monitoring requirements and associated reporting burdens.

Sustainable forestry operations must also adhere to the International Labour Organization's 18 criteria on human and social rights. Gender equality, health and well-being and community consultation are examples of such rights.

=== Ecosystem approach ===
The ecosystem approach has been prominent on the agenda of the Convention on Biological Diversity (CBD) since 1995. The CBD definition of the Ecosystem Approach and a set of principles for its application were developed at an expert meeting in Malawi in 1995, known as the Malawi Principles. The definition, 12 principles and 5 points of "operational guidance" were adopted by the fifth Conference of Parties (COP5) in 2000. The CBD definition is as follows:

The ecosystem approach is a strategy for the integrated management of land, water and living resources that promotes conservation and sustainable use in an equitable way. Application of the ecosystem approach will help to reach a balance of the three objectives of the Convention. An ecosystem approach is based on the application of appropriate scientific methodologies focused on levels of biological organization, which encompasses the essential structures, processes, functions and interactions among organisms and their environment. It recognizes that humans, with their cultural diversity, are an integral component of many ecosystems.

Sustainable forest management was recognized by parties to the Convention on Biological Diversity in 2004 (Decision VII/11 of COP7) to be a concrete means of applying the Ecosystem Approach to forest ecosystems. The two concepts, sustainable forest management and the ecosystem approach, aim at promoting conservation and management practices which are environmentally, socially and economically sustainable, and which generate and maintain benefits for both present and future generations. In Europe, the MCPFE and the Council for the Pan-European Biological and Landscape Diversity Strategy (PEBLDS) jointly recognized sustainable forest management to be consistent with the Ecosystem Approach in 2006.

=== Methods ===
==== Ecoforestry ====
Ecoforestry has been defined as restoration or selection forestry. The main idea of ecoforestry is to maintain or restore the forest to standards where the forest may still be harvested for products on a sustainable basis. Ecoforestry is forestry that emphasizes holistic practices which strive to protect and restore ecosystems rather than maximize economic productivity. Sustainability of the forest also comes with uncertainties. There are other factors that may affect the forest furthermore than that of the harvesting. There are internal conditions such as effects of soil compaction, tree damage, disease, fire, and blow down that also directly affect the ecosystem. These factors have to be taken into account when determining the sustainability of a forest. If these factors are added to the harvesting and production that comes out of the forest, then the forest will become less likely to survive, and will then become less sustainable.

Since the forest is considered an ecosystem, it is dependent on all of the living and non-living factors within itself. This is a major part of why the forest needs to be sustainable before it is harvested. For example, a tree, by way of photosynthesis, converts sunlight to sugars for respiration to keep the tree alive. The remains of the converted sugars is left in roots for consumption by the organisms surrounding the tree in the habitat. This shows the productivity of an ecosystem with its inhabitants. Productivity within the ecosystem cannot come to fruition unless the forest is sustainable enough to be harvested. If most individual organisms of the ecosystem vanish, the ecosystem itself is at risk. Once that happens, there is no longer any forest to harvest from. The overall productivity of a system can be found in an equation where the Net Primary Production, or NPP, is equal to the Gross Primary Production, or GPP, minus the Respiration, or R. The formula is the NPP = GPP - R. The NPP is the overall efficiency of the plants in the ecosystem. Through having a constant efficiency in NPP, the ecosystem is then more sustainable. The GPP refers to the rate of energy stored by photosynthesis in plants. The R refers to the maintenance and reproduction of plants from the energy expended.

Ecoforestry has many principles within the existence of itself. It covers sustainable development and the fair harvesting of the organisms living within the forest ecosystem. There have been many proposals of principles outlined for ecoforestry. They are covered over books, articles, and environmental agencies. All of the principles relate to the idea that in ecoforestry, less should be harvested, and diversity must be managed. Through harvesting less, there is enough biomass left in the forest, so that the forest may stay healthy and still stay maintained. It will grow at a sustainable level annually, and thus it will be able to still be harvested the following year. Through management of the diversity, species may cohabitate in an ecosystem where the forest may feed off of other species in its growth and production. The Principles of Ecoforestry may be found below.

==== Continuous cover forestry ====
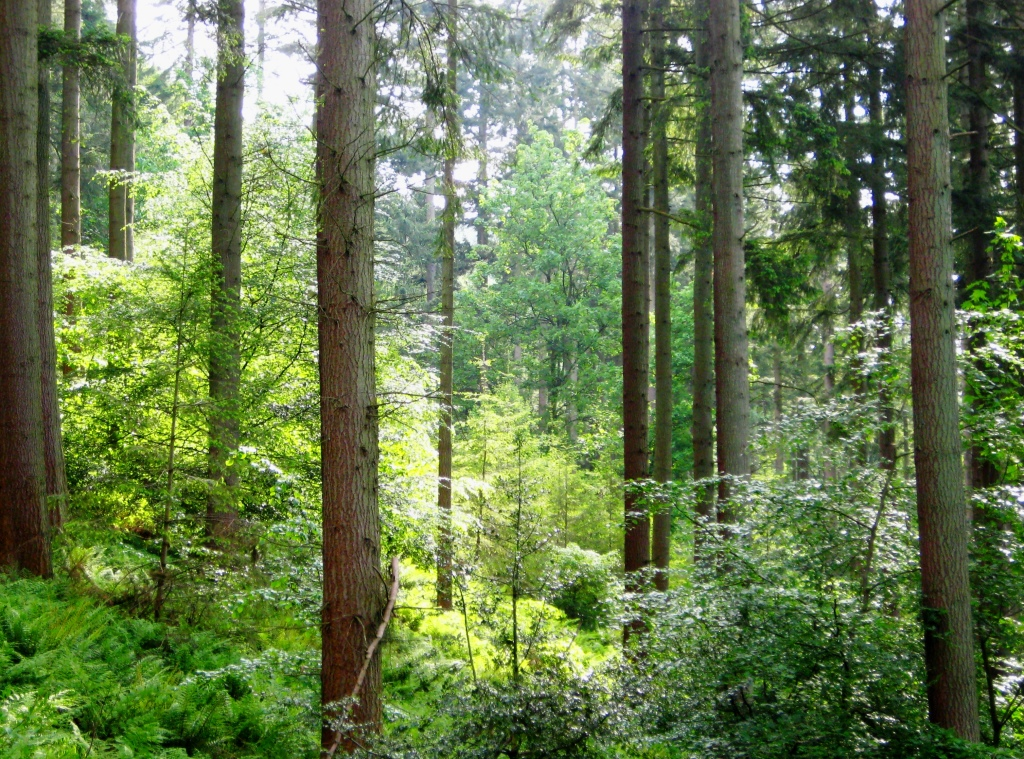
85-year-old stand of Douglas fir in the process of transformation to a continuous cover forest

Continuous cover forestry (commonly referred to as "CCF") is an approach to the sustainable management of forests whereby forest stands are maintained in a permanently irregular structure, which is created and sustained through the selection and harvesting of individual trees. The term "continuous cover forestry" does not equate exactly to any one particular silvicultural system, but is typified by selection systems. For example, coppice with standards and Reiniger's target diameter harvesting are also continuous cover forestry. Different existing forest stands may require different silvicultural interventions to achieve a continuously productive irregular structure. Crucially, clearcutting and other rotational forest management systems are avoided.

==== Mycoforestry ====
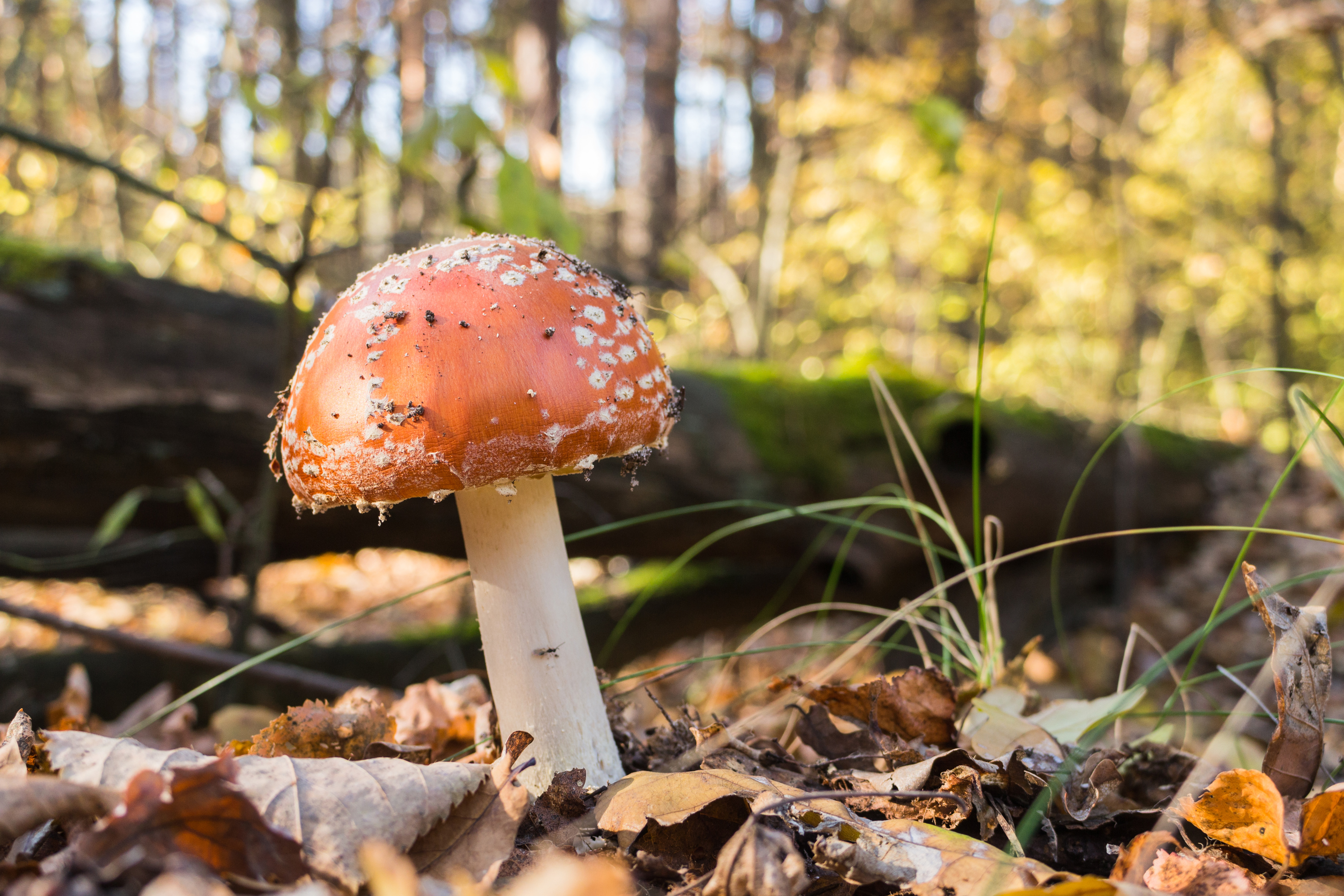
Amanita species are ectomycorrhizal with many trees.

Mycoforestry is an ecological forest management system implemented to enhance forest ecosystems and plant communities, by introducing the mycorrhizal and saprotrophic fungi. Mycoforestry is considered a type of permaculture and can be implemented as a beneficial component of an agroforestry system. It can enhance the yields of tree crops and produce edible mushrooms, an economically valuable product. By integrating plant-fungal associations into a forestry management system, native forests can be preserved, wood waste can be recycled back into the ecosystem, carbon sequestration can be increased, planted restoration sites are enhanced, and the sustainability of forest ecosystems are improved.

Mycoforestry is an alternative to the practice of clearcutting, which removes dead wood from forests, thereby diminishing nutrient availability and reducing soil depth.

===== Assisted natural regeneration =====
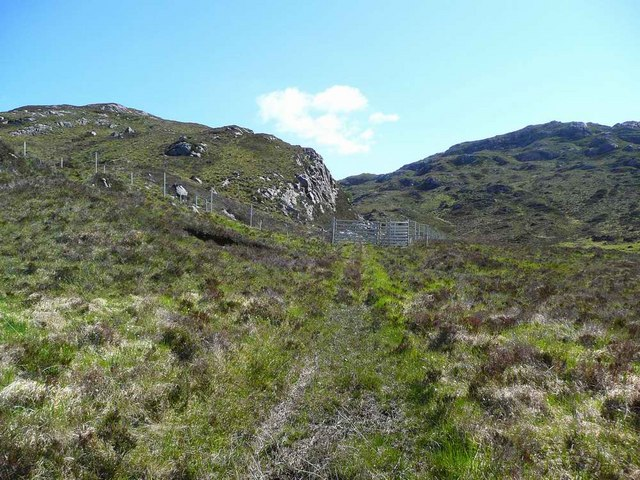
Deer fence and gate on the Tubeg track. This part of the south side of Loch Assynt has been fenced off to assist natural regeneration of the tree cover. So far, there are few trees showing, despite the OS mapping showing this as a wooded area.

Assisted natural regeneration (ANR) (also termed managed regrowth) is the human protection and preservation of natural tree seedlings in forested areas. Seedlings are, in particular, protected from undergrowth and extremely flammable plants such as Imperata grass. Though there is no formal definition or methodology, the overall goal of ANR is to create and improve forest productivity. It typically involves the reduction or removal of barriers to natural regeneration such as soil degradation, competition with weeds, grasses or other vegetation, and protection against disturbances, which can all interfere with growth. In addition to protection efforts, new trees are planted when needed or wanted (enrichment planting). With ANR, forests grow faster than they would naturally, resulting in a significant contribution to carbon sequestration efforts. It also serves as a cheaper alternative to reforestation due to decreased nursery needs.

The most effective way to implement ANR is very site-specific, and many nations provide guidebooks on how to select and maintain an ANR project.

==== Alternative harvesting methods ====
Reduced impact logging (RIL) is a sustainable forestry method as it decreases the forest and canopy damages by approximately 75% compared to the conventional logging methods. Additionally, a 120-year regression model found that RIL would have a significantly higher reforestation in 30 years ("18.3 m^{3} ha^{−1}") in relation to conventional logging ("14.0 m^{3} ha^{−1}"). Furthermore, it is essential that RIL should be practiced as soon as possible to improve reforestation in the future. For instance, a study concluded that logging would have to reduce by 40% in Brazil if the current logging measures stay of "6 trees/hectare with a 30-year cutting cycle" stay in place. This would be to ensure that future ground biomass to have regeneration of the original ground biomass prior to harvesting.

==== Preserving forest genetic resources ====
Appropriate use and long-term conservation of forest genetic resources (FGR) is a part of sustainable forest management. In particular when it comes to the adaptation of forests and forest management to climate change. Genetic diversity ensures that forest trees can survive, adapt and evolve under changing environmental conditions. Genetic diversity in forests also contributes to tree vitality and to the resilience towards pests and diseases. Furthermore, FGR has a crucial role in maintaining forest biological diversity at both species and ecosystem levels.

Selecting carefully the forest reproductive material with emphasis on getting a high genetic diversity rather than aiming at producing a uniform stand of trees, is essential for sustainable use of FGR. Considering the provenance is crucial as well. For example, in relation to climate change, local material may not have the genetic diversity or phenotypic plasticity to guarantee good performance under changed conditions. A different population from further away, which may have experienced selection under conditions more like those forecast for the site to be reforested, might represent a more suitable seed source.

== Problems ==
=== Forest degradation ===
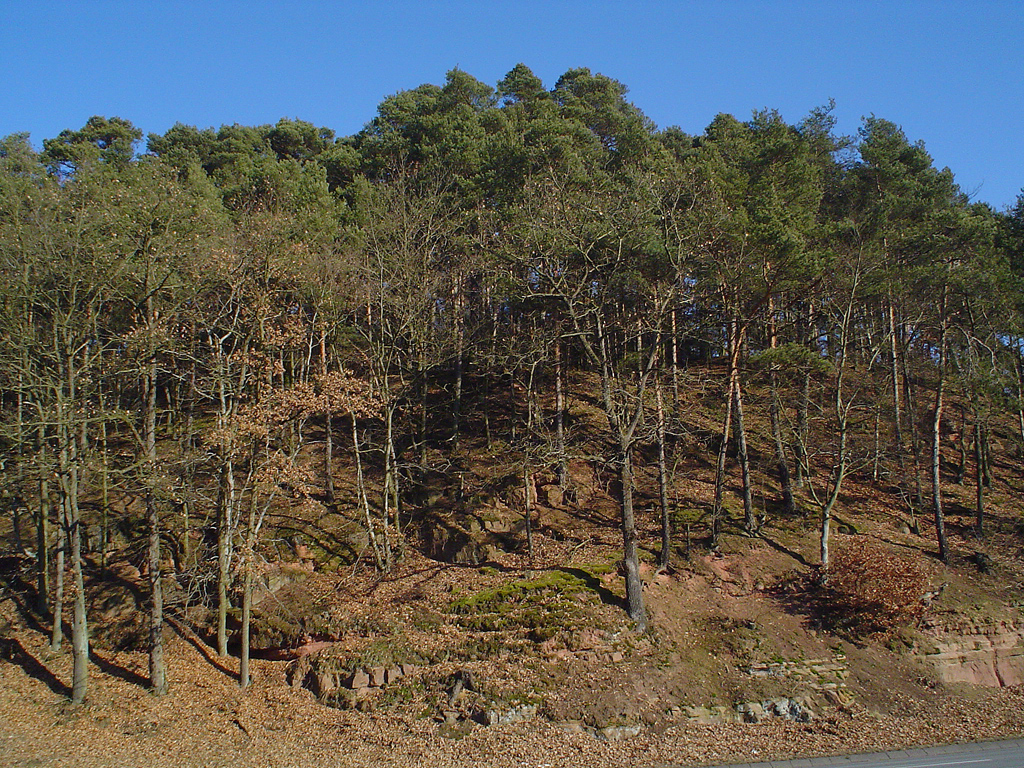
Degraded forest in Lahnberge, Germany: the soil is being washed out due to lack of vegetal cover, some trees are losing ground and they appear to be sick

Forest degradation is a process in which the biological wealth of a forest area is permanently diminished by some factor or by a combination of factors. "This does not involve a reduction of the forest area, but rather a quality decrease in its condition." The forest is still there, but with fewer trees, or fewer species of trees, plants or animals, or some of them affected by plagues. This degradation makes the forest less valuable and may lead to deforestation. Forest degradation is a type of the more general issue of land degradation. Deforestation and forest degradation continue to take place at alarming rates, which contributes significantly to the ongoing loss of biodiversity.

=== Deforestation ===
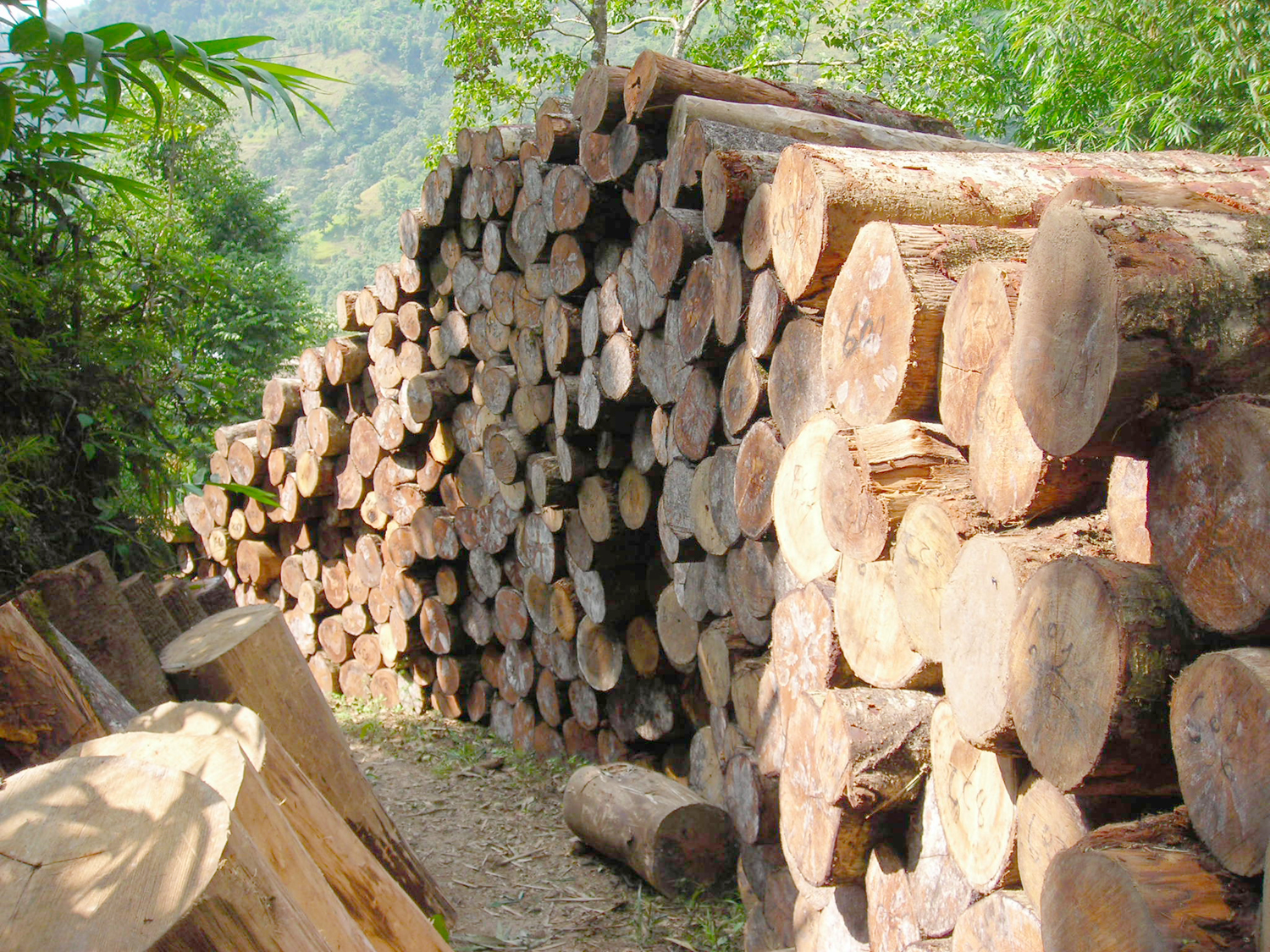
Timber logs before loading for sawmill in eastern Nepali village

Annual deforestation

Deforestation or forest clearance is the removal and destruction of a forest or stand of trees from land that is then converted to non-forest use. Deforestation can involve conversion of forest land to farms, ranches, or urban use. About 31% of Earth's land surface is covered by forests at present. This is one-third less than the forest cover before the expansion of agriculture, with half of that loss occurring in the last century. On average 2,400 trees are cut down each minute. Estimates vary widely as to the extent of deforestation in the tropics. In 2019, nearly a third of the overall tree cover loss, or 3.8 million hectares, occurred within humid tropical primary forests. These are areas of mature rainforest that are especially important for biodiversity and carbon storage.

By far, the direct cause of most deforestation is agriculture. In 2025 nearly 90% of global deforestation was caused by agriculture, with cropland expansion and pasture creation the primary drivers, this is up from more than 80% in 2012. Forests are being converted to plantations for coffee, palm oil, rubber and various other popular products. Livestock grazing also drives deforestation. Further drivers are the wood industry (logging), urbanization and mining. The effects of climate change are another cause via the increased risk of wildfires (see deforestation and climate change).

Deforestation results in habitat destruction which in turn leads to biodiversity loss. Deforestation also leads to extinction of animals and plants, changes to the local climate, and displacement of indigenous people who live in forests. Deforested regions often also suffer from other environmental problems such as desertification and soil erosion.

Another problem is that deforestation reduces the uptake of carbon dioxide (carbon sequestration) from the atmosphere. This reduces the potential of forests to assist with climate change mitigation. The role of forests in capturing and storing carbon and mitigating climate change is also important for the agricultural sector. The reason for this linkage is that the effects of climate change on agriculture pose new risks to global food systems.

Since 1990, it is estimated that some 420 million hectares of forest have been lost through conversion to other land uses, although the rate of deforestation has decreased over the past three decades. Between 2015 and 2020, the rate of deforestation was estimated at 10 million hectares per year, down from 16 million hectares per year in the 1990s. The area of primary forest worldwide has decreased by over 80 million hectares since 1990. More than 100 million hectares of forests are adversely affected by forest fires, pests, diseases, invasive species, drought and adverse weather events.

==== Deforestation and climate change ====
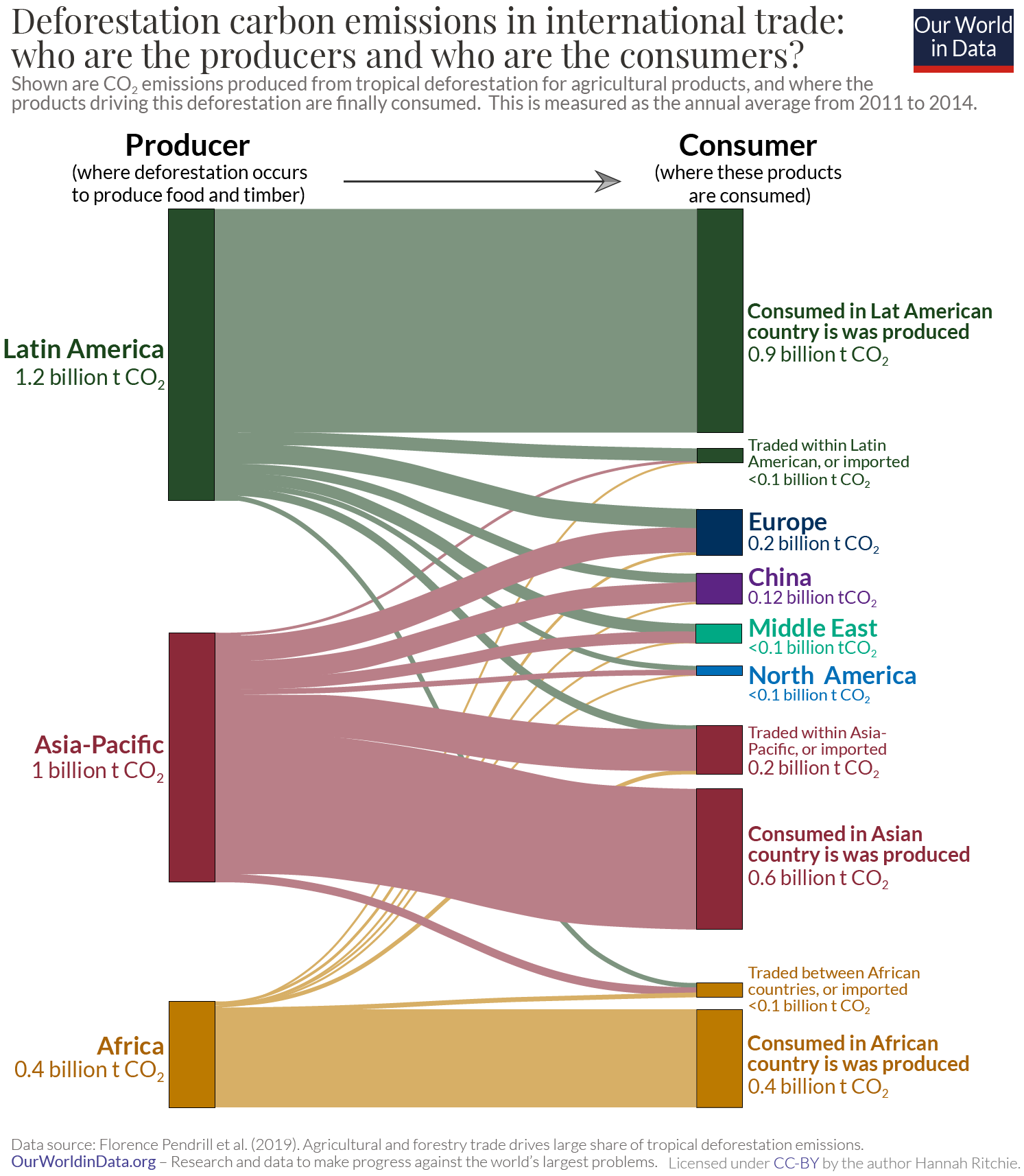
Deforestation in the tropics – given as the annual average between 2010 and 2014 – was responsible for 2.6 billion tonnes of CO_{2} per year. That was 6.5% of global CO_{2} emissions.

Deforestation is a primary contributor to climate change, and climate change affects the health of forests. Land use change, especially in the form of deforestation, is the second largest source of carbon dioxide emissions from human activities, after the burning of fossil fuels. Greenhouse gases are emitted from deforestation during the burning of forest biomass and decomposition of remaining plant material and soil carbon. Global models and national greenhouse gas inventories give similar results for deforestation emissions. As of 2019, deforestation is responsible for about 11% of global greenhouse gas emissions. Carbon emissions from tropical deforestation are accelerating.

When forests grow they are a carbon sink and therefore have potential to mitigate the effects of climate change. Some of the effects of climate change, such as more wildfires, invasive species, and extreme weather events can lead to more forest loss. The relationship between deforestation and climate change is one of a positive (amplifying) climate feedback. The more trees that are removed, the greater the effect of climate change which then results in the loss of more trees.

Forests cover 31% of the land area on Earth. Every year, 75,700 square kilometers (18.7 million acres) of the forest is lost. There was a 12% increase in the loss of primary tropical forests from 2019 to 2020.

Deforestation has many causes, among them agricultural clearcutting, livestock grazing, logging for timber, and wildfires.

=== Checkerboarding ===
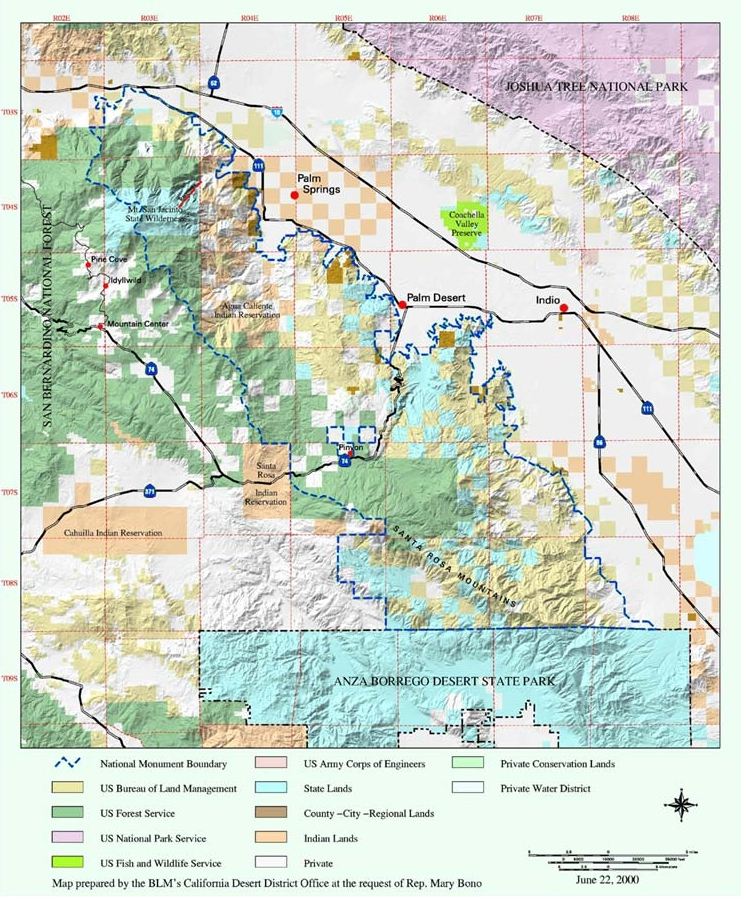
Map of the Santa Rosa and San Jacinto Mountains National Monument showing examples of checkerboarding

Checkerboarding refers to the intermingling of land ownership between two or more owners resulting in a checkerboard pattern. Checkerboarding is prevalent in the Western United States and Western Canada because of extensive use in railroad grants for western expansion, although it had its beginnings in the canal land grant era.

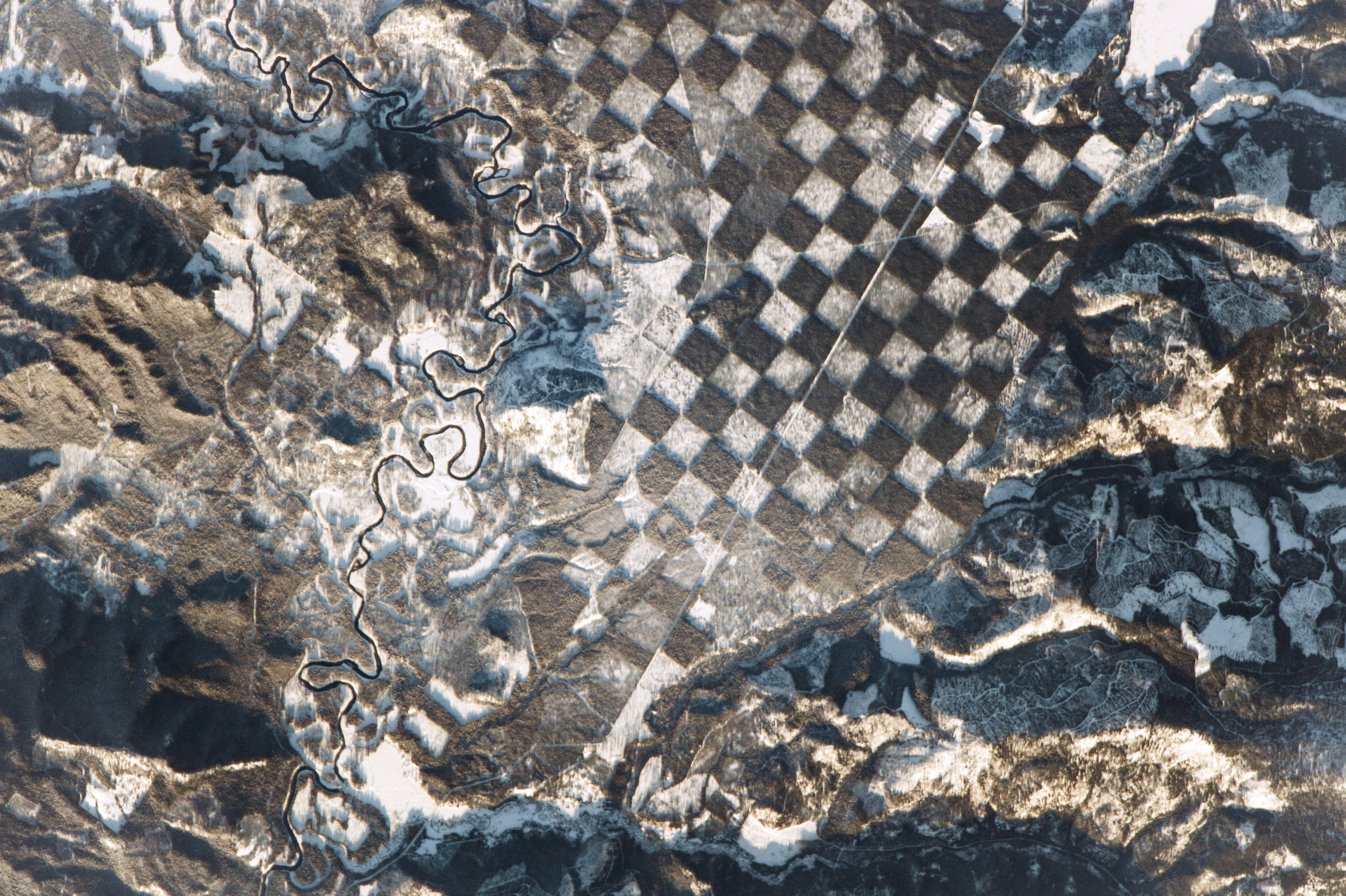
Checkerboard pattern alongside the Priest River in northern Idaho

Checkerboarding can create problems for access and ecological management. It is one of the major causes of inholdings within the boundaries of national forests. As is the case in northwestern California, checkerboarding has resulted in issues with managing national forest land. Checkerboarding was previously applied to these areas during the period of western expansion, and they are now commercial forest land. Conflicting policies establishing the rights of the private owners of this land have caused some difficulties in the local hardwood timber production economy.

While relieving this land from its checkerboard ownership structure could benefit the timber production economy of the region, checkerboards can allow government to extend good forestry practices over intermingled private lands, by demonstration or applying pressure via economy of scale or the right of access.

=== Unsustainable practices ===
==== Clear-cutting ====
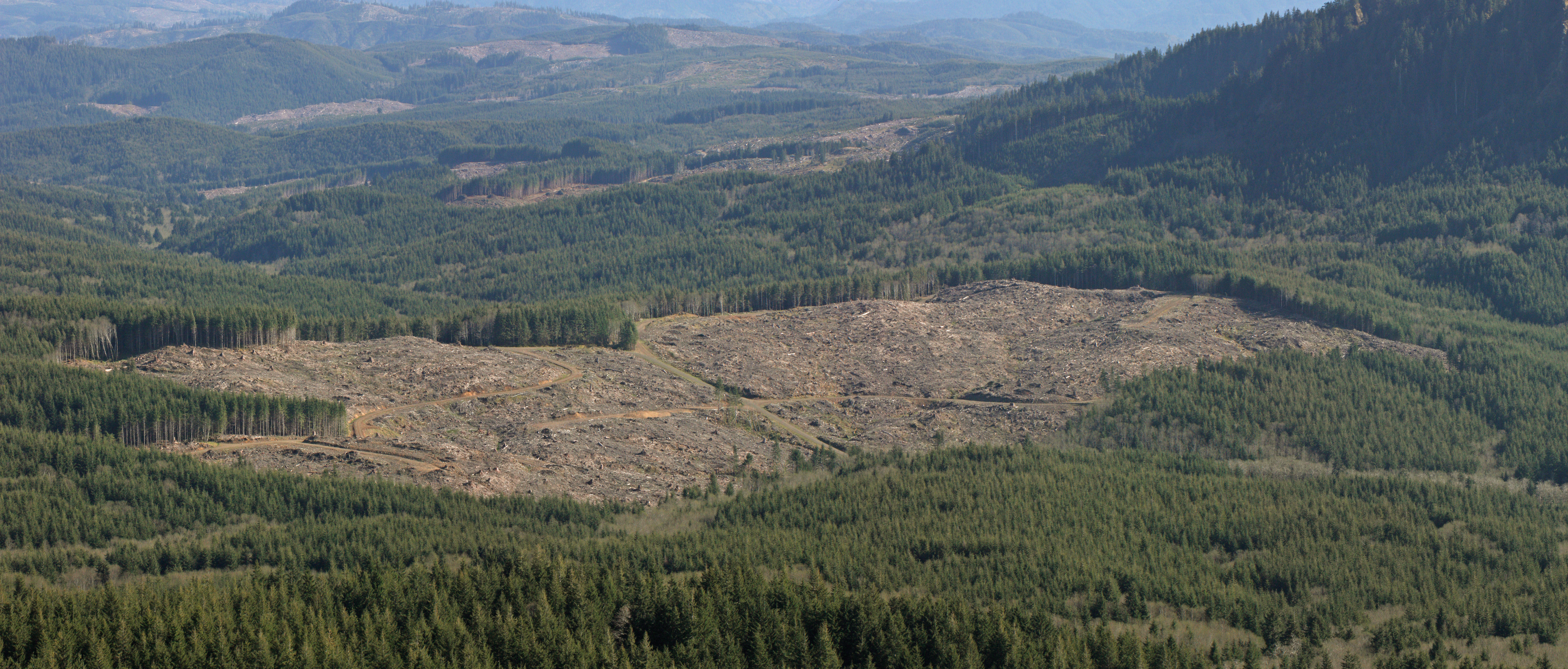
After a century of clearcutting, this forest, near the source of the Lewis and Clark River in Clatsop County, Oregon, is a patchwork. In each patch, most of the trees are the same age.

A forest before and after clearcutting

Clearcutting, clearfelling or clearcut logging is a practice in forestry and logging, in which most or all of the trees in an area are uniformly cut down. Along with shelterwood and seed tree harvests, it is used by foresters to create certain types of forest ecosystems and to promote select species that require an abundance of sunlight or grow in large, even-age stands. Clearcutting is a forestry practice that mimics the stand initiation stage of forest succession after a natural disturbance such as stand replacing fire or windthrow, and is successful for regeneration of fast growing, sun tolerant tree species and wildlife species that readily regenerate in post-stand replacing sites. Logging companies and forest-worker unions in some countries support the practice for scientific, safety and economic reasons, while detractors consider it a form of deforestation that destroys natural habitats and contributes to climate change. Environmentalists, traditional owners, local residents and others have regularly campaigned against clearcutting, including through the use of blockades and nonviolent direct action.

Clearcutting is the most economically efficient method of logging. It also may create detrimental side effects, such as the loss of topsoil, the costs of which are intensely debated by economic, environmental and other interests. In addition to the purpose of harvesting wood, clearcutting is used to create land for farming. Ultimately, the effects of clearcutting on the land will depend on how well or poorly the forest is managed, and whether it is converted to non-forest land uses after clearcuts.

While deforestation of both temperate and tropical forests through clearcutting has received considerable media attention in recent years, the other large forests of the world, such as the taiga, also known as boreal forests, are also under threat of rapid development. In Russia, North America and Scandinavia, creating protected areas and granting long-term leases to tend and regenerate trees—thus maximizing future harvests—are among the means used to limit the harmful effects of clearcutting. Long-term studies of clearcut forests, such as studies of the Pasoh Rainforest in Malaysia, are also important in providing insights into the conservation of forest resources worldwide.

==== Even-aged timber management ====
Ecological analysis indicates that even aged timber management can produce inferior outcomes for wildlife biodiversity and abundance. Some species thrive on uneven or natural forest tree distribution. For example, the wild turkey thrives when uneven heights and canopy variations exist and its numbers are diminished by even aged timber management.

==== Illegal logging ====
Illegal logging is the harvest, transportation, purchase, or sale of timber in violation of laws. The harvesting procedure itself may be illegal, including using corrupt means to gain access to forests; extraction without permission, or from a protected area; the cutting down of protected species; or the extraction of timber in excess of agreed limits. Illegal logging is a driving force for a number of environmental issues such as deforestation, soil erosion and biodiversity loss which can drive larger-scale environmental crises such as climate change and other forms of environmental degradation.

Illegality may also occur during transport, such as illegal processing and export (through fraudulent declaration to customs); the avoidance of taxes and other charges, and fraudulent certification. These acts are often referred to as "wood laundering".

Illegal logging is driven by a number of economic forces, such as demand for raw materials, land grabbing and demand for pasture for cattle. Regulation and prevention can happen at both the supply side, with better enforcement of environmental protections, and at the demand side, such as an increasing regulation of trade as part of the international lumber industry.

The term 'timber theft' is an alternate name for illegal logging, especially logging done on a smaller scale and without the landowner's permission.

== Certification systems ==
Forest certification is a globally recognized system for encouraging sustainable forest management and assuring that forest-based goods are derived from sustainably managed forests. This is a voluntary procedure in which an impartial third-party organization evaluates the quality of forest management and output against a set of criteria established by a governmental or commercial certification agency.

Growing environmental awareness and consumer demand for more socially responsible businesses helped third-party forest certification emerge in the 1990s as a credible tool for communicating the environmental and social performance of forest operations.

There are many potential users of certification, including: forest managers, scientists, policy makers, investors, environmental advocates, business consumers of wood and paper, and individuals.

With third-party forest certification, an independent standards setting organization (SSO) develops standards of good forest management, and independent auditors issue certificates to forest operations that comply with those standards. Forest certification verifies that forests are well-managed – as defined by a particular standard – and chain-of-custody certification tracks wood and paper products from the certified forest through processing to the point of sale.

This rise of certification led to the emergence of several different systems throughout the world. As a result, there is no single accepted forest management international standard worldwide. ISO members rejected a proposal for a forestry management system as requirements standard, with a consensus that a management system for certification would not be effective. Instead ISO members voted for a chain of custody of wood and wood-based products with ISO 38200 published in 2018. Without an international standard each system takes a somewhat different approach with scheme owners defining private standards for sustainable forest management.

In its 2009–2010 Forest Products Annual Market Review United Nations Economic Commission for Europe/Food and Agriculture Organization stated: "Over the years, many of the issues that previously divided the (certification) systems have become much less distinct. The largest certification systems now generally have the same structural programmatic requirements."

Third-party forest certification is an important tool for those seeking to ensure that the paper and wood products they purchase and use come from forests that are well-managed and legally harvested. Incorporating third-party certification into forest product procurement practices can be a centerpiece for comprehensive wood and paper policies that include factors such as the protection of sensitive forest values, thoughtful material selection and efficient use of products.

The Forest Stewardship Council is one of many forest certification programs.

Without a single international standard, there are a proliferation of private standards, with more than fifty scheme owners offering certification worldwide, addressing the diversity of forest types and tenures. Globally, the two largest umbrella certification programs are:

- Programme for the Endorsement of Forest Certification (PEFC)
- Forest Stewardship Council (FSC)

The Forest Stewardship Council's Policy on Conversion states that land areas converted from natural forests to round wood production after November 1994 are ineligible for Forest Stewardship Council certification.

The area of forest certified worldwide is growing slowly. PEFC is the world's largest forest certification system, with more than two-thirds of the total global certified area certified to its Sustainability Benchmarks. In 2021, PEFC issued a position statement defending their use of private standards in response to the Destruction: Certified report from Greenpeace.

In North America, there are three certification standards endorsed by PEFC – the Sustainable Forestry Initiative, the Canadian Standards Association's Sustainable Forest Management Standard, and the American Tree Farm System. SFI is the world's largest single forest certification standard by area. FSC has five standards in North America – one in the United States and four in Canada.

While certification is intended as a tool to enhance forest management practices throughout the world, to date most certified forestry operations are located in Europe and North America. A significant barrier for many forest managers in developing countries is that they lack the capacity to undergo a certification audit and maintain operations to a certification standard.

== Forest governance ==
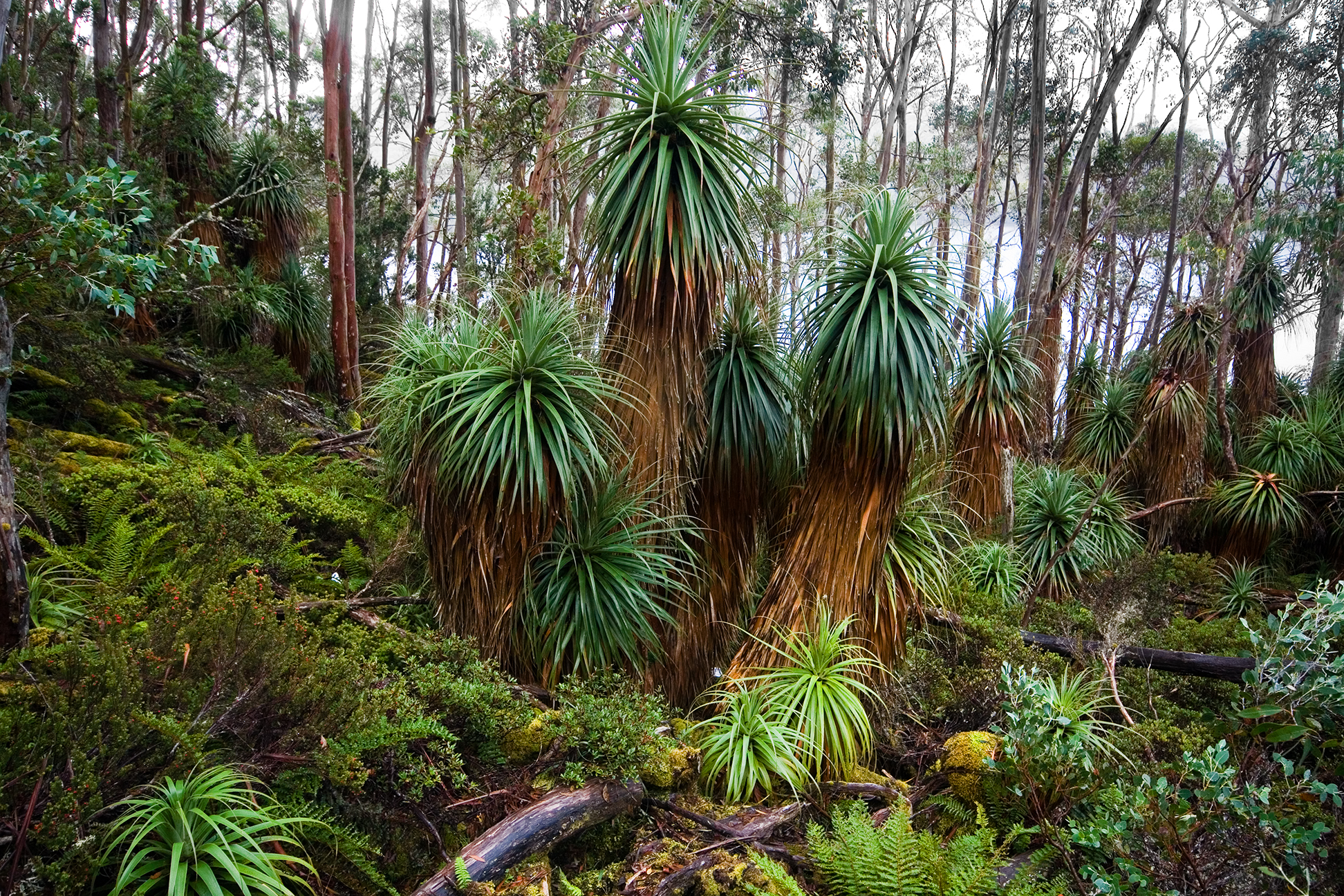
Pandani (Richea pandanifolia) near Lake Dobson, Mount Field National Park, Tasmania, Australia

Proportion of publicly owned forest area, by holder of management rights and region, 2020.

Although a majority of forests continue to be owned formally by government, the effectiveness of forest governance is increasingly independent of formal ownership. Since neo-liberal ideology in the 1980s and the emanation of the climate change challenges, evidence that the state is failing to effectively manage environmental resources has emerged. Under neo-liberal regimes in the developing countries, the role of the state has diminished and the market forces have increasingly taken over the dominant socio-economic role.

The shifting of natural resource management responsibilities from central to state and local governments, where this is occurring, is usually a part of broader decentralization process.

The development of National Forest Funds is one way to address the issue of financing sustainable forest management. National forest funds (NFFs) are dedicated financing mechanisms managed by public institutions designed to support the conservation and sustainable use of forest resources. As of 2014, there are 70 NFFs operating globally.

=== Community forestry ===
Community-based forest management (CBFM) is a scheme that links governmental forest agencies and the local community in efforts to regenerate degraded forests, reforest deforested areas, and decrease carbon emissions that contribute to climate change. This partnership is done with the intent of not only repairing damage to the environment but also providing economic and social benefits to the affected area.

In principle, the benefits for the local community involvement in the management and protection of their forests would be to provide employment and to supplement income from both the wage labor and additional agriculture which would then strength the entire local economy while improving environmental conditions and mitigating climate change. Therefore, implementing a CBFM system can provide rural development while mitigating climate change and sustaining biodiversity within the region. It is important to engage the local community members, many of which are indigenous since presumably, they would have a deeper knowledge of the local ecosystems as well as the life cycles of those ecosystems over time. Their involvement also helps to ensure that their cultural practices remain intact.

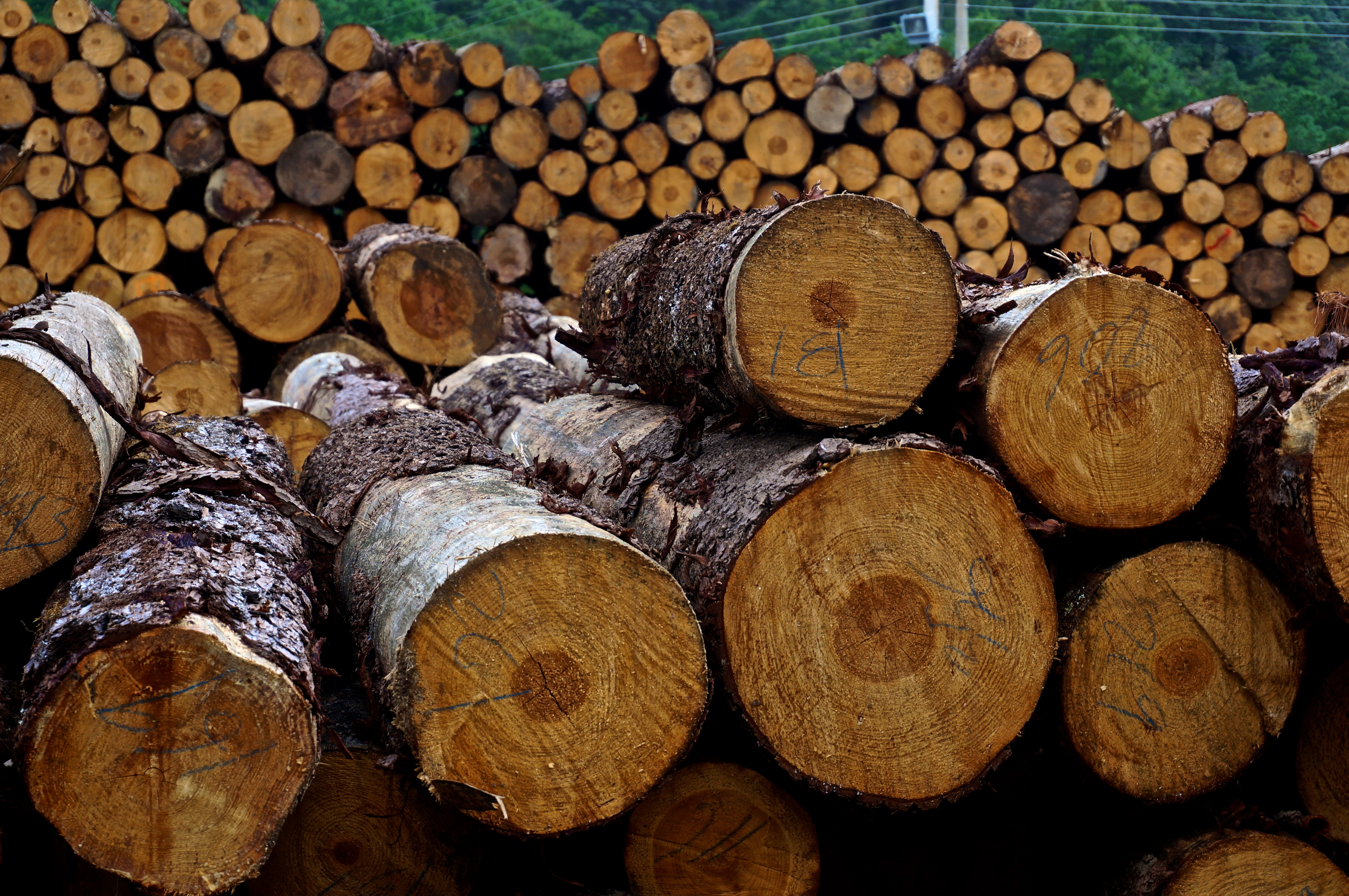
Logs from a community forest in Oaxaca, Mexico

Community forestry is a branch of forestry that deals with the communal management of forests for generating income from timber and non-timber forest products on one hand, and managing for ecosystem services such as watershed conservation, carbon sequestration and aesthetic values on the other hand. It has been considered one of the most promising options of combining forest conservation with rural development, community empowerment and poverty reduction objectives.

The concept of community forestry first came to prominence in the mid-1970s but is rooted in historical land management systems that prioritized collective stewardship. For example, in pre-colonial Africa, community-managed forests served as critical sources of food, medicine, and cultural heritage, governed through traditional norms and local leadership structures. Similarly, before enclosure or other land privatization efforts, European commons allowed communities to access forests for grazing, fuelwood, and construction materials under shared use. Around the world, colonial governance and widespread land privatization disrupted these practices by replacing communal systems with centralized or private control. In regions such as India, colonial forestry policies prioritized timber extraction and commercial gains, often displacing indigenous communities and undermining traditional knowledge. This widespread alienation of local populations from forest resources led to widespread degradation and social unrest, prompting calls for reform in Africa and other continents.

The re-emergence of community forestry in the 20th century was driven by growing recognition of the ecological and social failures of centralized forest policy efforts. Early movements, such as India’s Joint Forest Management in the 1970s and Nepal’s Forest User Groups in the 1980s, attempted to improve the management of forest resources and address environmental issues due to the countries failing centralized forest policy. These early efforts illustrated the potential of participatory governance to address resource depletion and empower marginalized communities. In 1978, FAO’s seminal work, Forestry for Local Community Development, laid the foundation for integrating scientific forestry with traditional practices in the modern period, arguing that empowering local communities not only conserved resources but also improved socio-economic outcomes. More recently, in the past few decades, community forestry has been implemented in developing countries and has been modestly successful in its aims of sustainable forest management, climate change adaptation, and securing socio-economic benefits for local communities.

However, a study by the Overseas Development Institute has shown that the technical, managerial and financial requirements stipulated by community forestry frameworks are often incompatible with local realities and interests. A successful legal and institutional framework must incorporate the strengthening of existing institutions and enable the dissemination of locally appropriate practices as well as the local capacity for regulation and control. In practice, successful models have combined adaptive management with community-driven initiatives. For example, Mexico’s community forest enterprises (CFEs) demonstrated that decentralized governance could generate substantial economic benefits while maintaining ecological integrity. Similarly, Nepal’s participatory forest management made progress in reducing poverty and restoring forest cover.

As of 2016, FAO estimated that almost one-third of the world's forest area is under some form of community-based management.

=== Forestry law ===
Forestry laws govern activities in designated , most commonly with respect to and . Forestry laws generally adopt management policies for public forest resources, such as and . Forest management is split between private and public management, with public forests being sovereign property of the State. Forestry laws are now considered an international affair.

Governmental agencies are generally responsible for planning and implementing forestry laws on public forest lands, and may be involved in , planning, and , and oversight of timber sales. Forestry laws are also dependent on social and economic contexts of the region in which they are implemented. The development of scientific forestry management is based on the precise measurement of the distribution and volume of wood in a given parcel, the systematic felling of trees, and their replacement by standard, carefully aligned rows of mono-cultural plantations that could be harvested at set times.

== Mitigation of deforestation and climate change ==
Countries participating in the UNREDD program and/or Forest Carbon Partnership Facility. UN-REDD participants Forest Carbon Partnership Facility participants participants in both

Scientific studies investigate the ability of forests to absorb carbon dioxide from the atmosphere (carbon sequestration). Through such analysis, researchers can quantify the carbon stocks present in different types of forests and assess their effectiveness as carbon sinks. Understanding the capacity of forests to sequester carbon is crucial for climate change mitigation efforts.

=== Forest protection ===
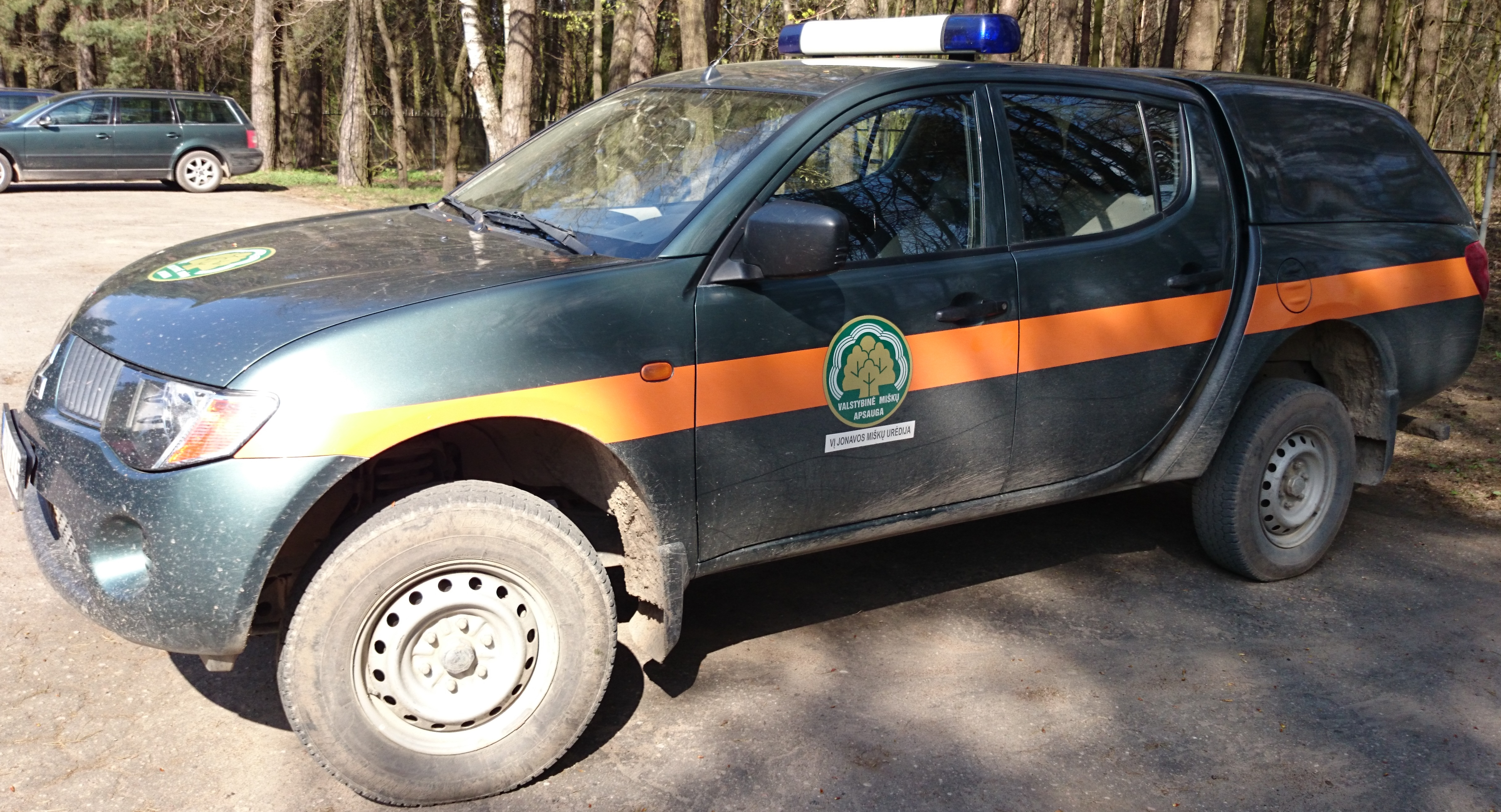
Forest security in Lithuania

Forest protection is a branch of forestry which is concerned with the preservation or improvement of a forest and prevention and control of damage to forest by natural or man made causes like forest fires, plant pests, and adverse climatic conditions (global warming).

Forest protection also has a legal status and rather than protection from only people damaging the forests is seen to be broader and include forest pathology too. Due to the different emphases there exist widely different methods forest protection.

In German-speaking countries, forest protection would focus on the biotic and abiotic factors that are non-crime related. A protected forest is not the same as a protection forest. These terms can lead to some confusion in English, although they are clearer in other languages. As a result, reading English literature can be problematic for non-experts due to localization and conflation of meanings.

The types of man-induced abuse that forest protection seeks to prevent include:

- Aggressive or unsustainable intensive farming and logging
- Pollution of the forest soil
- Expanding city development caused by population explosion and the resulting urban sprawl

There is considerable debate over the effectiveness of forest protection methods. Enforcement of laws regarding purchased forest land is weak or non-existent in most parts of the world. In the increasingly dangerous South America, home of major rainforests, officials of the Brazilian National Agency for the Environment (IBAMA) have recently been shot during their routine duties.

==== Tropical rainforest conservation ====
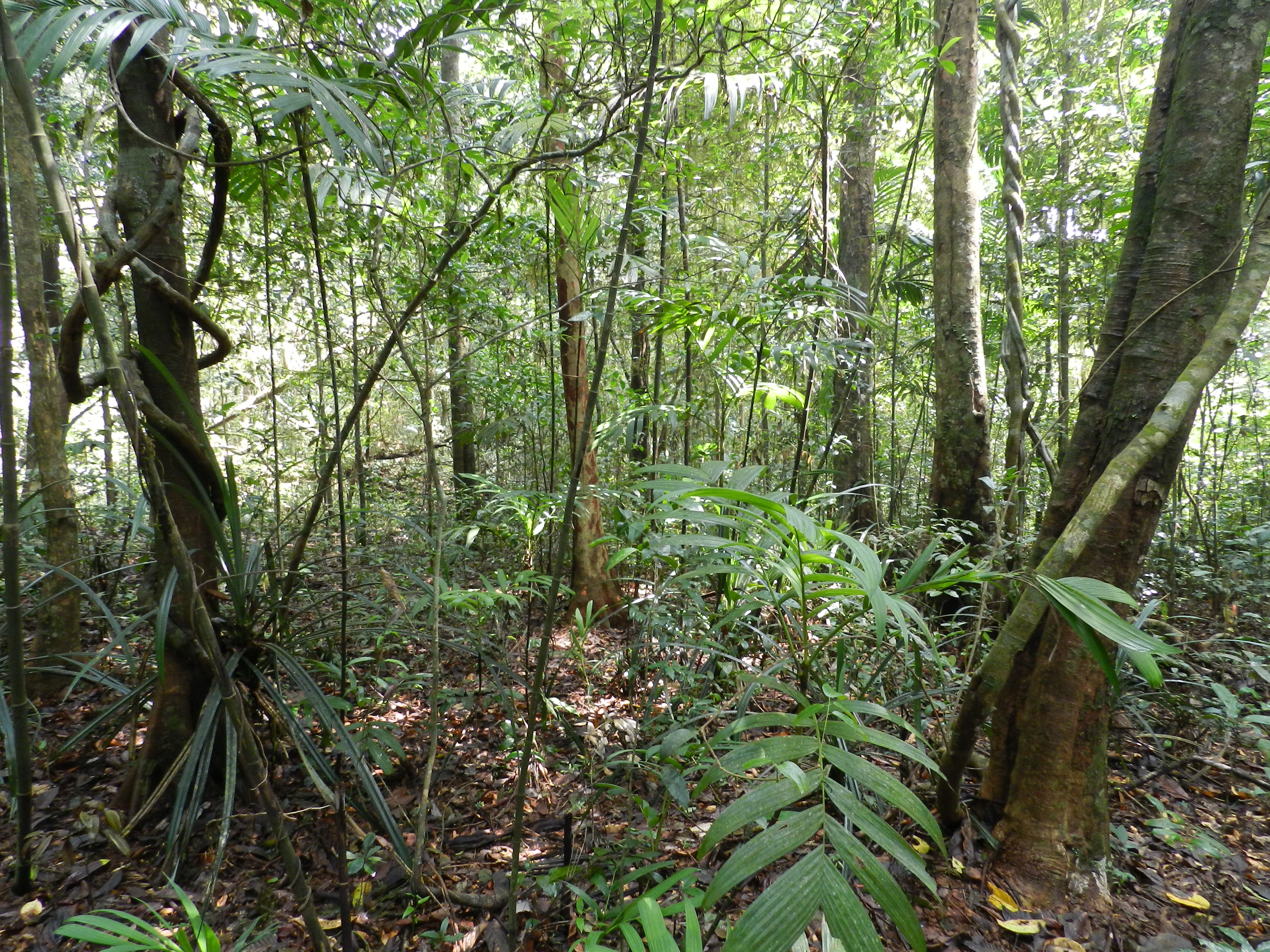
Tropical rainforest in Agumbe, India

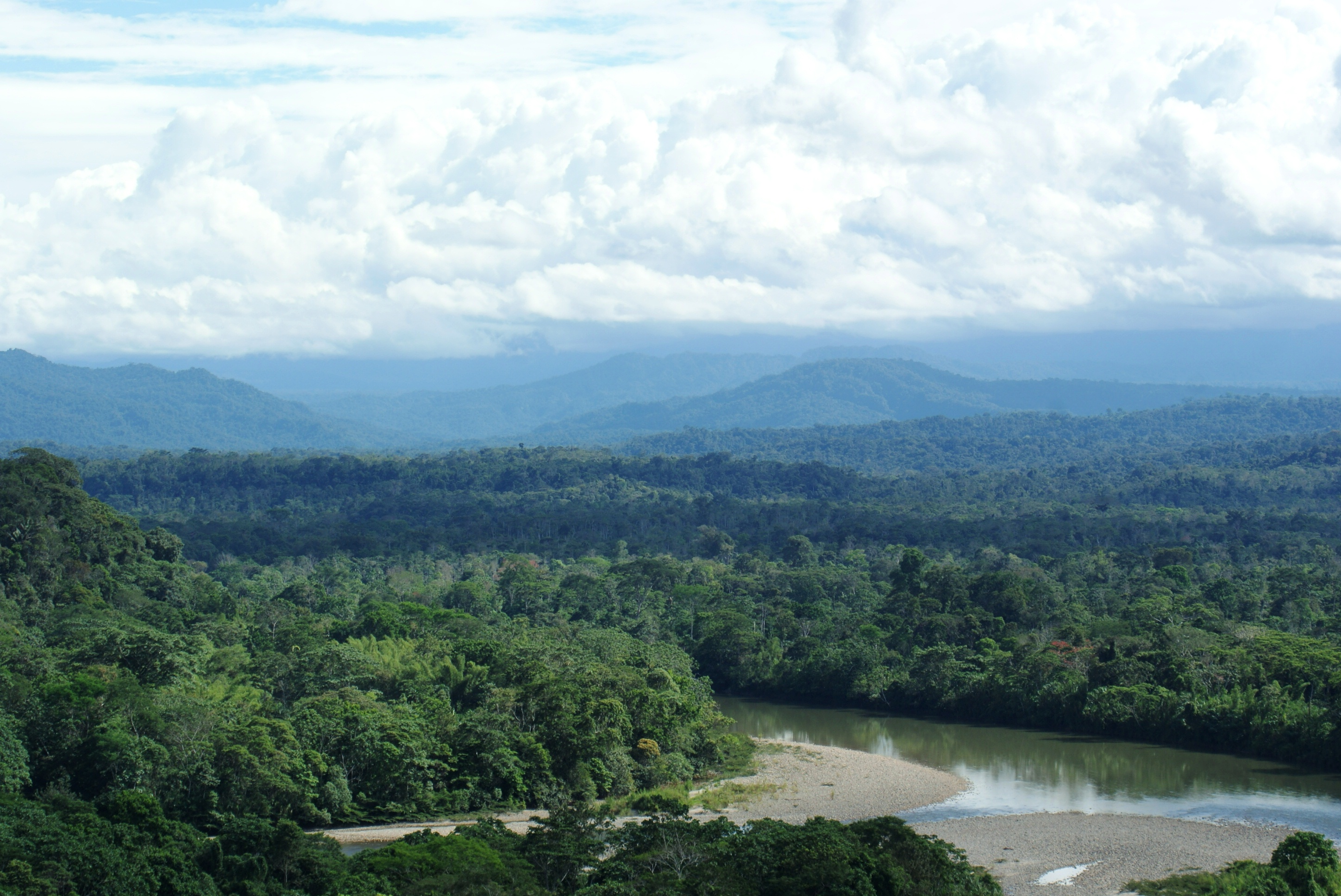
Amazon rainforest

Tropical rainforest map

Building blocks for tropical rainforest conservation include ecotourism and rehabilitation. Reforestation and restoration are common practices in certain areas to try to increase tropical rainforest density. By communicating with the local people living in, and around, the rainforest, conservationists can learn more about what might allow them to best focus their efforts. Rainforests are globally important to sustainability and preservation of biodiversity. Although they may vary in location and inhabited species of plants and animals, they remain important worldwide for their abundance of natural resources and for the ecosystem services. It is important to take into consideration the differing species and the biodiversity that exists across different rainforest types in order to accurately implement methods of conservation.

=== Proforestation ===
Proforestation is the practice of protecting existing natural forests to foster continuous growth, carbon accumulation, and structural complexity. It is recognized as an important forest based strategy for addressing the global crises in climate and biodiversity. Forest restoration can be a strategy for climate change mitigation. Proforestation complements other forest-based solutions like afforestation, reforestation and improved forest management.

Allowing proforestation in some secondary forests will increase their accumulated carbon and biodiversity over time. Strategies for proforestation include rewilding, such as reintroducing apex predators and keystone species as, for example, predators keep the population of herbivores in check (which reduce the biomass of vegetation). Another strategy is establishing wildlife corridors connecting isolated protected areas.

Proforestation refers specifically to enabling continuous forest growth uninterrupted by active management or timber harvesting, a term coined by scientists William Moomaw, Susan Masino, and Edward Faison.

Proforestation differs from agroforestry or the cultivation of forest plantations, the latter consisting of similarly aged trees of just one or two species. Plantations can be an efficient source of wood but often come at the expense of natural forests and cultivate little habitat for biodiversity, such as dead and fallen trees or understory plants. Further, once factoring in emissions from clearing the land and the decay of plantation waste and products at the end of their often brief lifecycles (e.g. paper products), plantations sequester 40 times less carbon than natural forests.

Proforestation is specifically recommended in "World Scientists' Warning of a Climate Emergency, as a means to "quickly curtail habitat and biodiversity loss" and protect "high carbon stores" and areas "with the capacity to rapidly sequester carbon."

==== Increasing Forest and Community Resilience ====
1.6 billion people worldwide depend on forests for their livelihoods, including 300–350 million (half of whom are Indigenous peoples) who live near or within "dense forests" and depend almost entirely on these ecosystems for their survival. Rural households in Asia, Africa, and Latin America also depend on forests for about a quarter of their total incomes, with about half of this in the form of food, fodder, energy, building materials and medicine. Proforestation can protect full native biodiversity and support the forests and other land types that provide resources we need. For example, research has found that old growth and complex forests are more resistant to the effects of climate change. One study found that taller trees had increased drought resistance, being able to capture and retain water better, due to their deeper root system and larger biomass. This means that even in dry conditions, these trees continued to photosynthesize at a higher rate than smaller trees. Further, old-growth forests have been shown to be more resistant to fires compared to young forests with trees that have thinner bark and with more fuel available for increasing temperatures and fire damage. Proforestation can help to reduce fire risks to forests and the surrounding communities. They can also help absorb water and prevent flooding to surrounding communities. Considering the variety of ecosystem services complex forests provide, sustaining healthy forests means adjacent communities will be better off as well.

== Workers ==
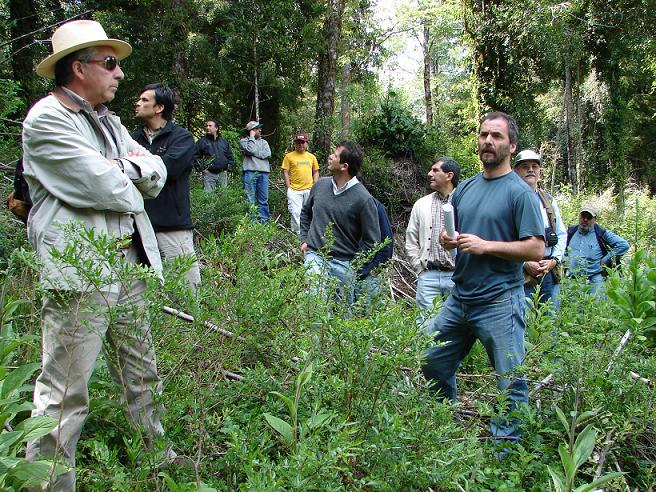
Foresters of Southern University of Chile in the Valdivian forests of San Pablo de Tregua, Chile.

A forester is a person who practices forest management and forestry, the science, art, and profession of managing forests. Foresters engage in a broad range of activities including ecological restoration and management of protected areas. Foresters manage forests to provide a variety of objectives including direct extraction of raw material, outdoor recreation, conservation, hunting and aesthetics. Emerging management practices include managing forestlands for biodiversity, carbon sequestration and air quality.

== History ==
The preindustrial age has been dubbed by Werner Sombart and others as the 'wooden age', as timber and firewood were the basic resources for energy, construction and housing. The development of modern forestry is closely connected with the rise of capitalism, the economy as a science and varying notions of land use and property. Roman Latifundiae, large agricultural estates, were quite successful in maintaining the large supply of wood that was necessary for the Roman Empire. Large deforestations came with the decline of the Romans. However already in the 5th century, monks in the then Byzantine Romagna on the Adriatic coast, were able to establish stone pine plantations to provide fuelwood and food. This was the beginning of the massive forest mentioned by Dante Alighieri in his 1308 poem Divine Comedy.

Similar sustainable formal forestry practices were developed by the Visigoths in the 7th century when, faced with the ever-increasing shortage of wood, they instituted a code concerned with the preservation of oak and pine forests. The use and management of many forest resources has a long history in China as well, dating back to the Han dynasty and taking place under the landowning gentry. A similar approach was used in Japan. It was also later written about by the Ming dynasty Chinese scholar Xu Guangqi (1562–1633).

In Europe, land usage rights in medieval and early modern times allowed different users to access forests and pastures. Plant litter and resin extraction were important, as pitch (resin) was essential for the caulking of ships, falking and hunting rights, firewood and building, timber gathering in wood pastures, and grazing animals in forests. The notion of "commons" (German "Allmende") refers to the underlying traditional legal term of common land. The idea of enclosed private property came about during modern times. However, most hunting rights were retained by members of the nobility which preserved the right of the nobility to access and use common land for recreation, like fox hunting.

=== 13th to 16th century ===
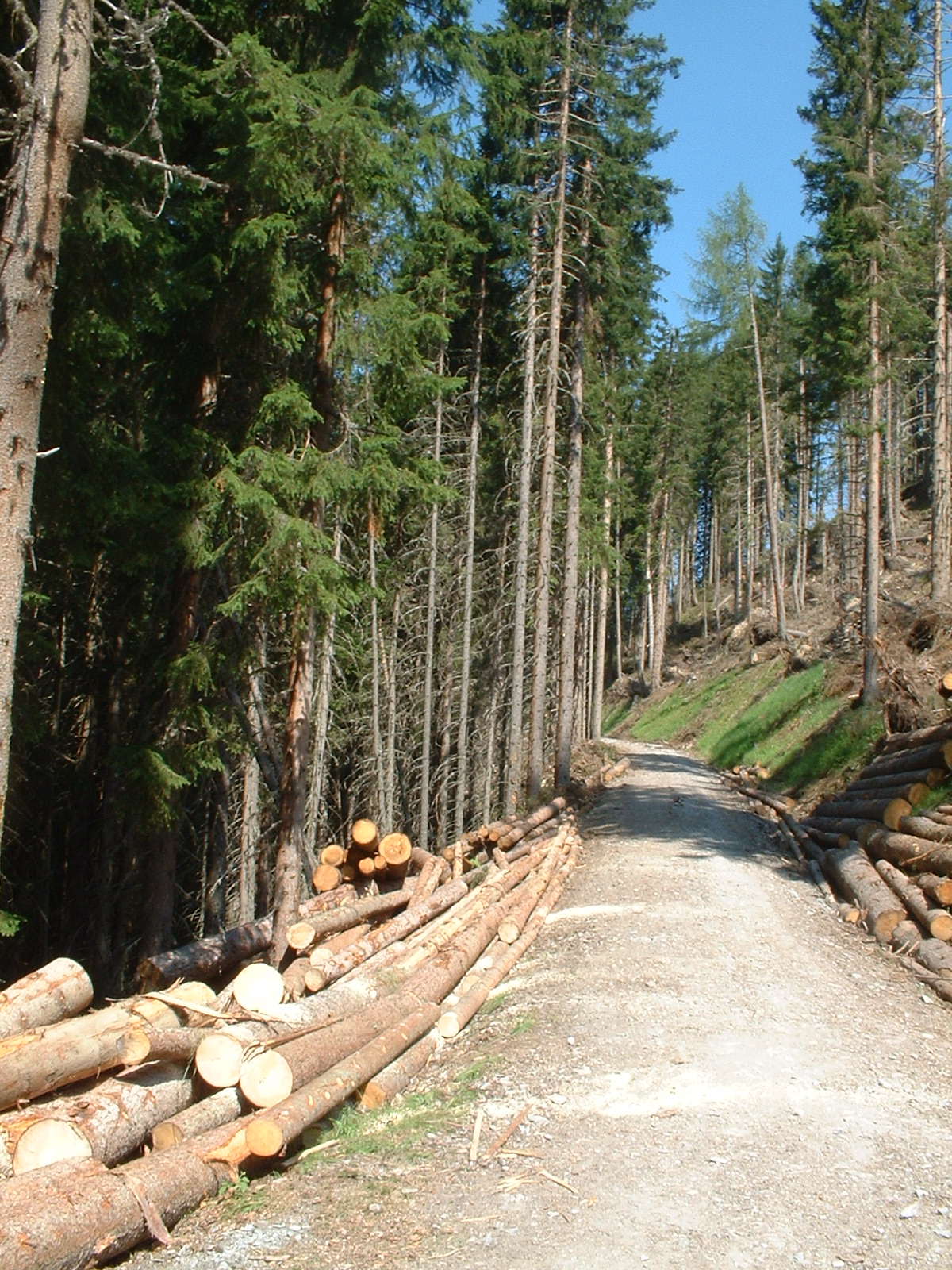
Forestry work in Austria

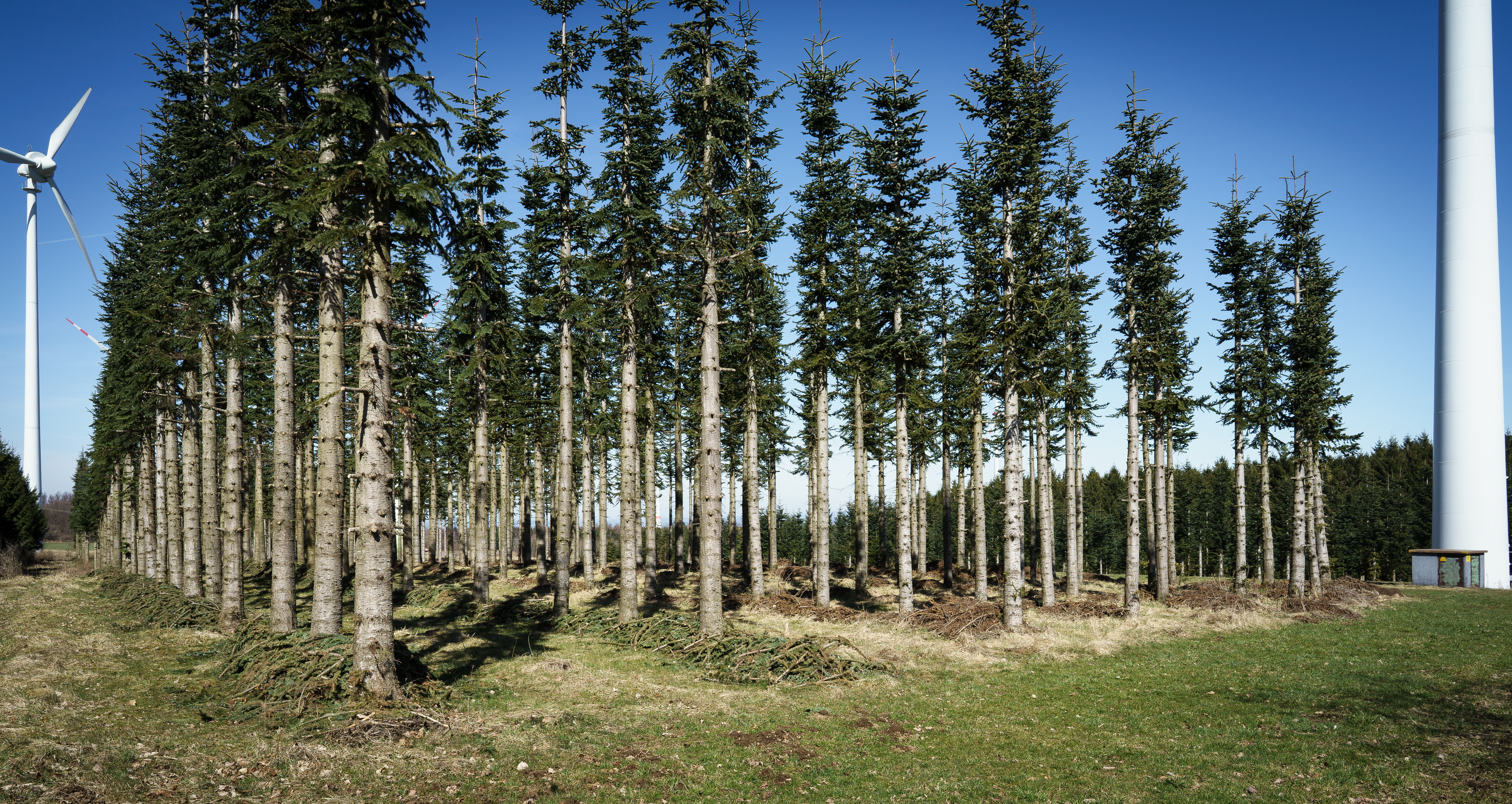
Exploitation of brushwood at the Golden Steinrueck, Vogelsberg

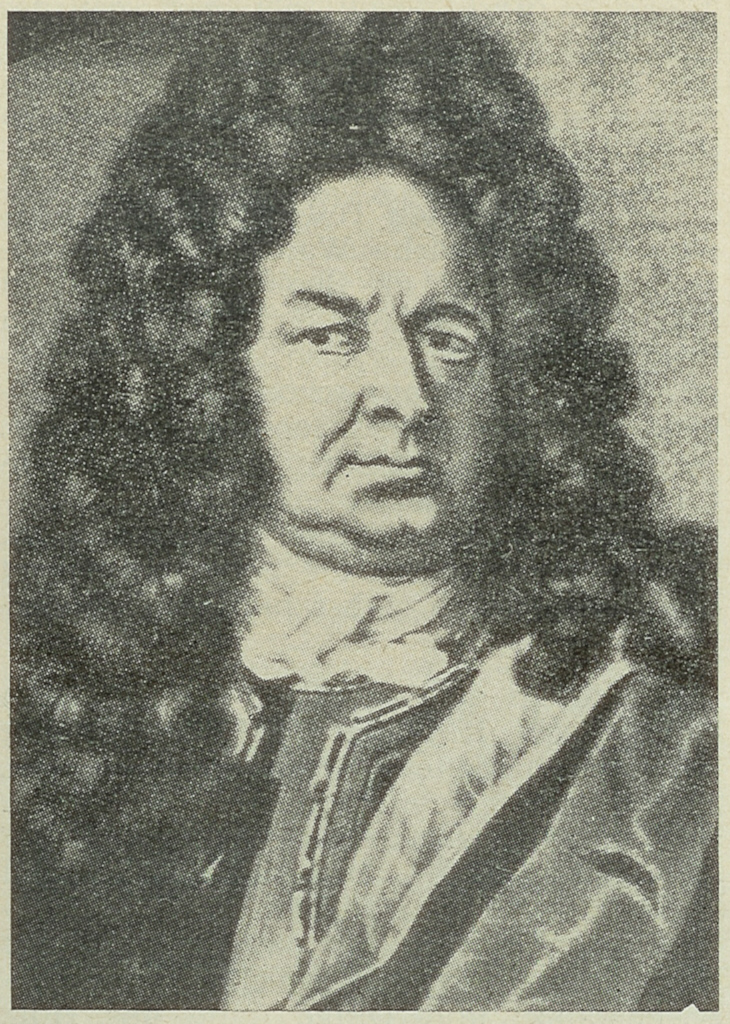
Hans Carl von Carlowitz, German miner

Systematic management of forests for a sustainable yield of timber began in Portugal in the 13th century when King Afonso III planted the Pinhal do Rei (King's Pine Forest) near Leiria to prevent coastal erosion and soil degradation, and as a sustainable source for timber used in naval construction. His successor King Denis of Portugal continued the practice and the forest exists still today.

Forest management also flourished in the German states in the 14th century, e.g. in Nuremberg, and in 16th-century Japan. Typically, a forest was divided into specific sections and mapped; the harvest of timber was planned with an eye to regeneration. As timber rafting allowed for connecting large continental forests, as in south western Germany, via Main, Neckar, Danube and Rhine with the coastal cities and states, early modern forestry and remote trading were closely connected. Large firs in the black forest were called "Holländer," as they were traded to the Dutch ship yards. Large timber rafts on the Rhine were 200 to 400m in length, 40m in width and consisted of several thousand logs. The crew consisted of 400 to 500 men, including shelter, bakeries, ovens and livestock stables. Timber rafting infrastructure allowed for large interconnected networks all over continental Europe and is still of importance in Finland.

Starting with the 16th century, enhanced world maritime trade, a boom in housing construction in Europe, and the success and further Berggeschrey (rushes) of the mining industry increased timber consumption sharply. The notion of 'Nachhaltigkeit', sustainability in forestry, is closely connected to the work of Hans Carl von Carlowitz (1645–1714), a mining administrator in Saxony. His book Sylvicultura oeconomica, oder haußwirthliche Nachricht und Naturmäßige Anweisung zur wilden Baum-Zucht (1713) was the first comprehensive treatise about sustainable yield forestry. In the UK, and, to an extent, in continental Europe, the enclosure movement and the Clearances favored strictly enclosed private property. The Agrarian reformers, early economic writers and scientists tried to get rid of the traditional commons. At the time, an alleged tragedy of the commons together with fears of a Holznot, an imminent wood shortage played a watershed role in the controversies about cooperative land use patterns.

The practice of establishing tree plantations in the British Isles was promoted by John Evelyn, though it had already acquired some popularity. Louis XIV's minister Jean-Baptiste Colbert's oak Forest of Tronçais, planted for the future use of the French Navy, matured as expected in the mid-19th century: "Colbert had thought of everything except the steamship," Fernand Braudel observed. Colbert's vision of forestry management was encoded in the French forestry Ordinance of 1669, which proved to be an influential management system throughout Europe. In parallel, schools of forestry were established beginning in the late 18th century in Hesse, Russia, Austria-Hungary, Sweden, France and elsewhere in Europe.

=== Mechanization in 19th century ===
Forestry mechanization was always in close connection to metal working and the development of mechanical tools to cut and transport timber to its destination. Rafting belongs to the earliest means of transport. Steel saws came up in the 15th century. The 19th century widely increased the availability of steel for whipsaws and introduced forest railways and railways in general for transport and as forestry customer. Further human induced changes, however, came since World War II, respectively in line with the "1950s syndrome." The first portable chainsaw was invented in 1918 in Canada, but large impact of mechanization in forestry started after World War II. Forestry harvesters are among the most recent developments. Although drones, planes, laser scanning, satellites and robots also play a part in forestry.

=== Forest conservation and early globalization ===
Starting from the 1750s modern scientific forestry was developed in France and the German speaking countries in the context of natural history scholarship and state administration inspired by physiocracy and cameralism. Its main traits were centralized management by professional foresters, the adherence to sustainable yield concepts with a bias towards fuelwood and timber production, artificial afforestation, and a critical view of pastoral and agricultural uses of forests.

During the late 19th and early 20th centuries, forest preservation programs were established in British India, the United States, and Europe. Many foresters were either from continental Europe (like Sir Dietrich Brandis), or educated there (like Gifford Pinchot). Sir Dietrich Brandis is considered the father of tropical forestry, European concepts and practices had to be adapted in tropical and semi-arid climate zones. The development of plantation forestry was one of the (controversial) answers to the specific challenges in the tropical colonies. The enactment and evolution of forest laws and binding regulations occurred in most Western nations in the 20th century in response to growing conservation concerns and the increasing technological capacity of logging companies. Tropical forestry is a separate branch of forestry which deals mainly with equatorial forests that yield woods such as teak and mahogany.

=== 21st century ===
A strong body of research exists regarding the management of forest ecosystems and the genetic improvement of tree species and varieties. Forestry studies also include the development of better methods for the planting, protecting, thinning, controlled burning, felling, extracting, and processing of timber. One of the applications of modern forestry is reforestation, in which trees are planted and tended in a given area.

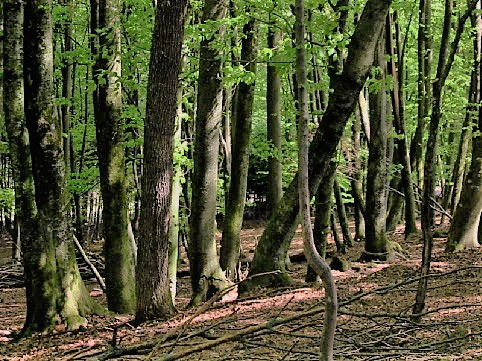
A deciduous beech forest in Slovenia

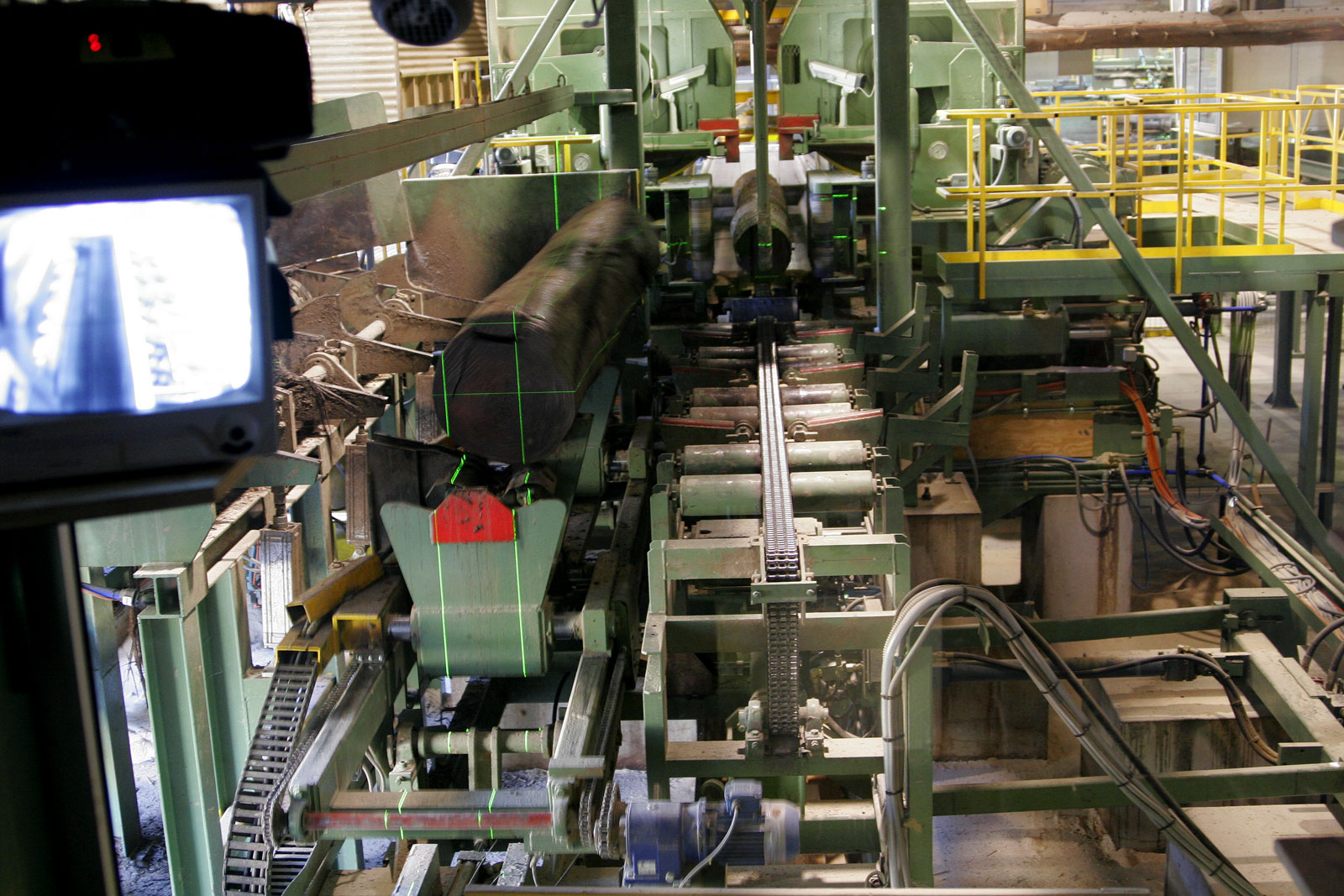
A modern sawmill

A comparison of employment In agriculture, forestry and fishing by region

Trees provide numerous environmental, social and economic benefits for people. In many regions, the forest industry is of major ecological, economic, and social importance, with the United States producing more timber than any other country in the world. Third-party certification systems that provide independent verification of sound forest stewardship and sustainable forestry have become commonplace in many areas since the 1990s. These certification systems developed as a response to criticism of some forestry practices, particularly deforestation in less-developed regions along with concerns over resource management in the developed world. Sustainable forestry operations must also adhere to the International Labour Organization's 18 criteria on human and social rights. Gender equality, health and well-being and community consultation are examples of mentioned rights.

In topographically severe forested terrain, proper forestry is important for the prevention or minimization of serious soil erosion or even landslides. In areas with a high potential for landslides, forests can stabilize soils and prevent property damage or loss, human injury, or loss of life.

Global production of roundwood rose from 3.5 billion m³ in 2000 to 4 billion m³ in 2021. In 2021, wood fuel was the main product with a 49 percent share of the total (2 billion m³), followed by coniferous industrial roundwood with 30 percent (1.2 billion m³) and non-coniferous industrial roundwood with 21 percent (0.9 billion m³). Asia and the Americas are the two main producing regions, accounting for 29 and 28 percent of the total roundwood production, respectively; Africa and Europe have similar shares of 20–21 percent, while Oceania produces the remaining 2 percent.

Many lower- and middle-income countries rely on wood for energy purposes (notably cooking). The largest producers are all in these income groups and have large populations with a high reliance on wood for energy: in 2021, India ranked first with 300 million m³ (15 percent of total production), followed by China with 156 million m3 and Brazil with 129 million m³ (8 percent and 7 percent of global production).

=== Journals ===
- Sylwan first published in 1820.
- Schweizerische Zeitschrift für Forstwesen first published in 1850.
- Erdészeti Lapok first published in 1862 (Hungary, 1862–present).
- The Indian Forester first published in 1875.
- Šumarski list (Forestry Review, Croatia) was published in 1877 by Croatian Forestry Society.
- Montes (Forestry, Spain) first published in 1877.
- Revista pădurilor (Journal of Forests, Romania, 1881–1882; 1886–present), the oldest extant magazine in Romania.
- Forestry Quarterly, first published in 1902 by the New York State College of Forestry.
- Šumarstvo (Forestry, Serbia) first published in 1948 by the Ministry of Forestry of Democratic Federal Yugoslavia, and since 1951 by Organ of Society of Forestry Engineers and Technicians of the Republic of Serbia (succeeding the former Šumarski glasnik published from 1907 to 1921).

== Society and culture ==
=== Public input and awareness ===
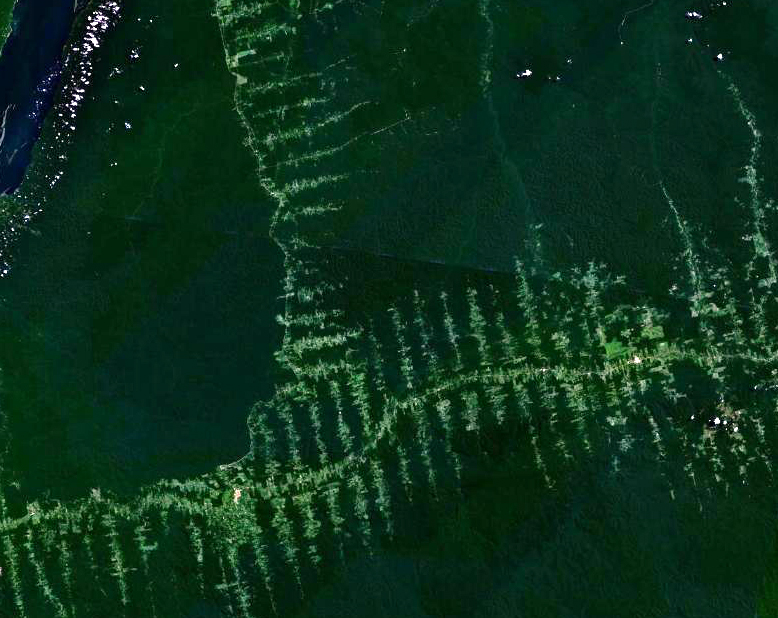
Deforestation and increased road-building in the Amazon rainforest are a significant concern because of increased human encroachment upon wild areas, increased resource extraction and further threats to biodiversity.

There has been increased public awareness of natural resource policy, including forest management. Public concern regarding forest management may have shifted from the extraction of timber for economic development, to maintaining the flow of the range of ecosystem services provided by forests, including provision of habitat for wildlife, protecting biodiversity, watershed management, and opportunities for recreation. Increased environmental awareness may contribute to an increased public mistrust of forest management professionals. But it can also lead to greater understanding about what professionals do for forests for nature conservation and ecological services.

== By region ==
=== Developing world ===
In December 2007, at the Climate Change Conference in Bali, the issue of deforestation in the developing world in particular was raised and discussed. The foundations of a new incentive mechanism for encouraging sustainable forest management measures was therefore laid in hopes of reducing world deforestation rates. This mechanism was formalized and adopted as REDD in November 2010 at the Climate Change Conference in Cancun by UNFCCC COP 16. Developing countries who are signatories of the CBD were encouraged to take measure to implement REDD activities in the hope of becoming more active contributors of global efforts aimed at the mitigation greenhouse gas, as deforestation and forest degradation account for roughly 15% of total global greenhouse gas emissions. The REDD activities are formally tasked with "reducing emissions from deforestation and forest degradation; and the role of conservation, sustainable management of forests and enhancement of forest carbon stocks in developing countries". REDD+ works in 3 phases. The first phase consists of developing viable strategies, while the second phase begins work on technology development and technology transfer to the developing countries taking part in REDD+ activities. The last phase measures and reports the implementation of the action taken. In 2021 the LEAF coalition was created, aiming to provide 1 billion dollars to countries that will protect their tropical and subtropical forests.

=== European Union ===
In 2022 the European parliament approved a bill aiming to stop the import linked with deforestation. The bill may cause to Brazil, for example, to stop deforestation for agricultural production and begun to "increase productivity on existing agricultural land." The legislation was adopted with some changes by the European Council in May 2023 and is expected to enter into force several weeks after. The bill requires companies who want to import certain types of products to the European Union to prove the production of those commodities is not linked to areas deforested after 31 of December 2020. It prohibits also import of products linked with Human rights abuse. The list of products includes: palm oil, cattle, wood, coffee, cocoa, rubber and soy. Some derivatives of those products are also included: chocolate, furniture, printed paper and several palm oil based derivatives.

=== Great Britain ===
The Forestry Commission was founded in 1919 to restore forests to Great Britain after World War I. The commission regulates both private and public forests, as well as manages private forests. Agricultural land was bought and transformed, totaling 35% of the British woodland area having been possessed at one point in time.

=== America ===
==== Canada ====
Canada's significant contribution to global sustainable forest management with its 166 million hectares of forest land independently certified as sustainably managed, representing 40% of the world's certified forests, which is more than any other country. Approximately 94% of Canada's forest land is publicly owned. Sustainable forest management strategies aim to reconcile various immediate demands while ensuring that forests continue to provide benefits for future generations.

The province of Ontario has its own sustainable forest management measures in place. A little less than half of all the publicly owned forests of Ontario are managed forests, required by The Crown Forest Sustainability Act to be managed sustainably. Sustainable management is often done by forest companies who are granted Sustainable Forest Licenses which are valid for 20 years. The main goal of Ontario's sustainable forest management measures is to ensure that the forest are kept healthy and productive, conserving biodiversity, all whilst supporting communities and forest industry jobs. All management strategies and plans are highly regulated, arranged to last for a 10-year period, and follow the strict guidelines of the Forest Management Planning Manual. Alongside public sustainable forest management, the government of Ontario encourages sustainable forest management of Ontario's private forests as well through incentives. So far, 44% of Ontario's crown forests are managed.

In order for logging to begin, the forestry companies must present a plan to the government who will then communicate to the public, First Nations and other industries in order to protect forest values. The plan must include strategies on how the forest values will be protected, assessing the state of the forest and whether it is capable of recovering from human activity, and presenting strategies on regeneration. After the harvest begins, the government monitors if the company is complying within the planned restrictions and also monitors the health of the ecosystem (soil depletion and erosion, water contamination, wildlife...). Failure to comply may result in fines, suspensions, removal of harvesting rights, confiscation of harvested timber and possible imprisonment.

==== United States ====
In the beginning of the year 2020 the "Save the Redwoods League" after a successful crowdfunding campaign bought " Alder Creek" a piece of land 583 acres large, with 483 big Sequoia trees including the 5th largest tree in the world. The organizations plan to make there forest thinning that is a controversial operation.

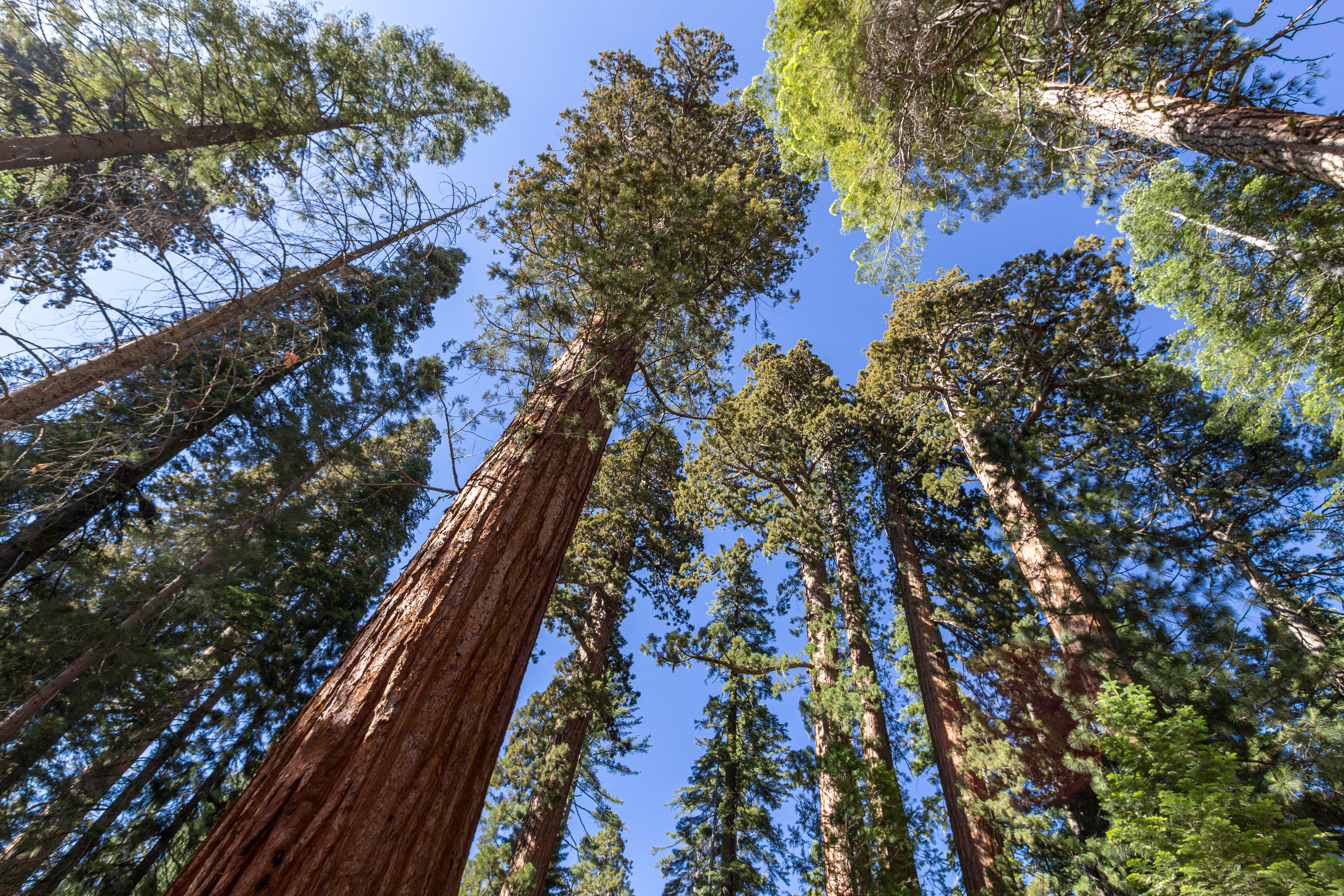
Mariposa Grove of Giant Sequoias, Yosemite National Park

In the United States, forest conservation is the practice of planning and maintaining forested areas for the benefit and sustainability of future generations. Forest conservation involves the upkeep of the natural resources within a forest that are beneficial for both humans and the ecosystem. Forests provide wildlife with a suitable habitat for living which allows the ecosystem to be biodiverse and benefit other natural processes. Forests also filter groundwater and prevent runoff keeping water safe for human consumption. There are many types of forests to consider and various techniques to preserve them. Each type of forest in the United States faces specific threats. However, there are various techniques to implement that will protect and preserve them.

Different types of forests have adapted throughout history, allowing them to thrive in specific habitats. Forests in the United States can be categorized into three main forest biomes, they are boreal, temperate, or sub-tropical based on the location and climate of the forest. Each of these biomes faces various threats of deforestation, urban development, soil compaction, species extinction, unmanaged recreational use, invasive species, or any combination of these threats. But there are many techniques that can be implemented for forest conservation efforts. This includes methods such as afforestation, reforestation, selective logging, controlled burns, wildland fire use, laws and policies, advocacy groups, and wildlife management areas. Additionally, multiple United States government programs support forest conservation efforts.

=== Asia ===
==== Russia ====
In 2019 after severe wildfires and public pressure the Russian government decided to take a number of measures for more effective forest management, what is considered as a big victory for the Environmental movement.

==== Indonesia ====
In August 2019, a court in Indonesia stopped the construction of a dam that could heavily hurt forests and villagers in the area.

In 2020 the rate of deforestation in Indonesia was the slowest since 1990. It was 75% lower than in 2019. This is because the government stopped issuing new licences to cut forests, including for palm oil plantations. The falling price of palm oil facilitated making it. Very wet weather reduced wildfires what also contributed to the achievement.

=== Africa ===
==== Congo ====
In August 2021 UNESCO removed the Salonga National Park from its list of threatened sites. Forbidding oil drilling, reducing poaching played crucial role in the achievement. The event is considered as a big win to Democratic Republic of the Congo as the Salonga forest is the biggest protected rainforest in Africa.

==== Kenya ====
In accordance with Article 10 of the Kenyan Constitution, which mandates the incorporation of sustainable development into all laws and decisions regarding public policy, including forest conservation and management. Kenya responds to continued deforestation, forest degradation, and forest encroachment, which results in conversion of land uses to settlement and agriculture, by taking action.

== See also ==
- Conservation biology
- Coppicing
- Environmental protection
- Forest farming
- Forest inventory
- Forest plans
- Outline of forestry
- Sustainable land management
- Category:Forest conservation

== Sources ==
This article incorporates text from a free content work. Licensed under CC BY 4.0 (license statement/permission). Text taken from Global Forest Resources Assessment 2025, Food and Agriculture Organization of the United Nations (FAO).
