= Conservation movement =

Sociopolitical advocacy for protecting natural resources

The conservation movement, also known as nature conservation, is an environmental, social, and political movement, that seeks to manage and protect natural resources, including animal, plant, and other living species as well as their habitat for the future. Conservationists are concerned with leaving the environment in a better state than the condition they found it in. Evidence-based conservation seeks to use high quality scientific evidence to make conservation efforts more effective.

The early conservation movement evolved out of necessity to maintain natural resources such as fisheries, wildlife management, water, soil, as well as conservation and sustainable forestry. The contemporary conservation movement has broadened from the early movement's emphasis on use of sustainable yield of natural resources and preservation of wilderness areas to include preservation of biodiversity. Some say the conservation movement is part of the broader and more far-reaching environmental movement, while others argue that they differ both in ideology and practice.

== History ==
=== Early history ===
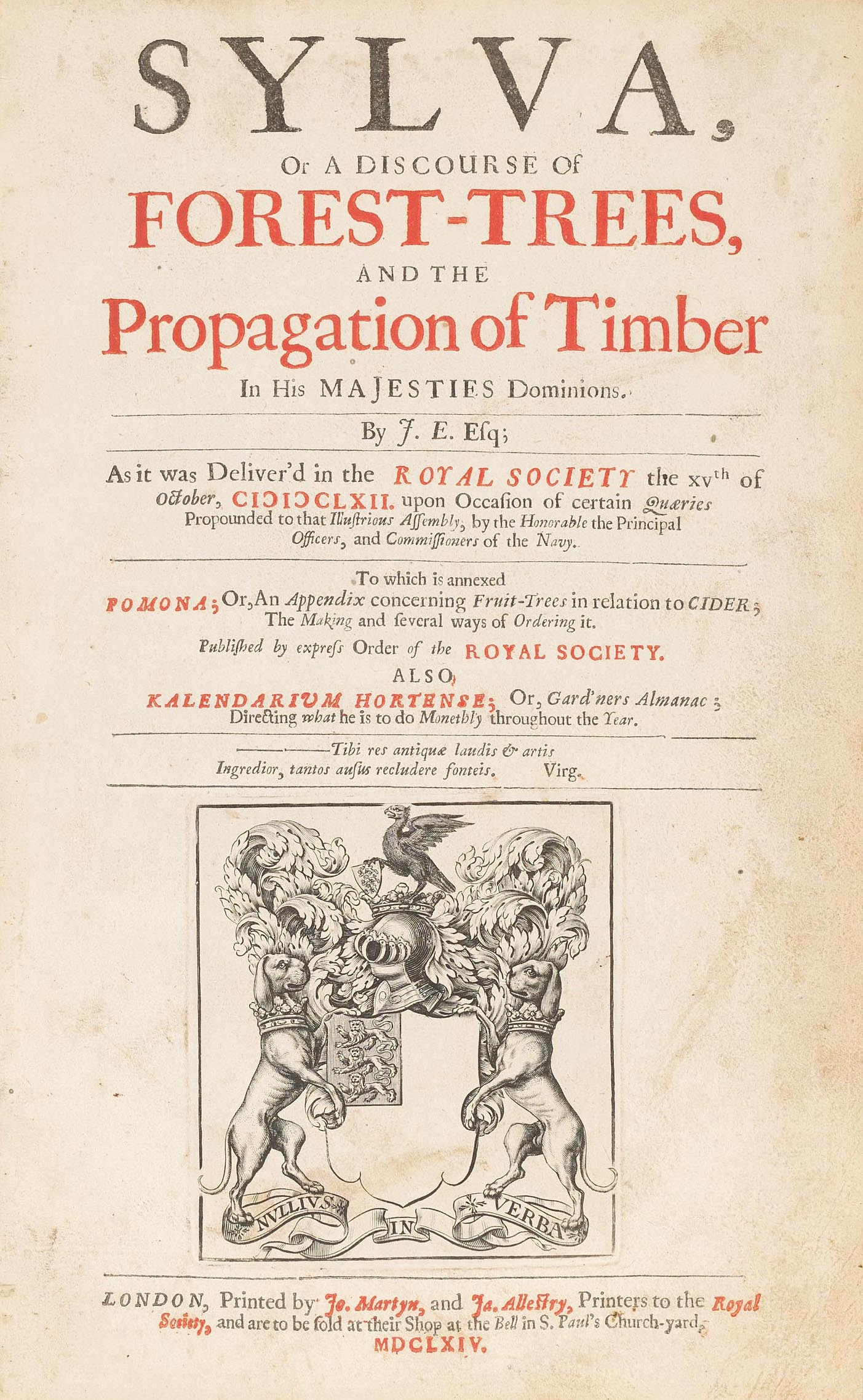
Sylva, or A Discourse of Forest-Trees and the Propagation of Timber in His Majesty's Dominions, title page of the first edition (1664)

The conservation movement can be traced back to John Evelyn's work Sylva, which was presented as a paper to the Royal Society in 1662. Published as a book two years later, it was one of the most highly influential texts on forestry ever published. Timber resources in England were becoming dangerously depleted at the time, and Evelyn advocated the importance of conserving the forests by managing the rate of depletion and ensuring that the cut down trees get replenished.

Khejarli massacre:

The Bishnoi narrate the story of Amrita Devi, a member of the sect who inspired as many as 363 other Bishnois to go to their deaths in protest of the cutting down of Khejri trees on 12 September 1730. The Maharaja of Jodhpur, Abhay Singh, requiring wood for the construction of a new palace, sent soldiers to cut trees in the village of Khejarli, which was called Jehnad at that time. Noticing their actions, Amrita Devi hugged a tree in an attempt to stop them. Her family then adopted the same strategy, as did other local people when the news spread. She told the soldiers that she considered their actions to be an insult to her faith and that she was prepared to die to save the trees. The soldiers did indeed kill her and others until Abhay Singh was informed of what was going on and intervened to stop the massacre. Some of the 363 Bishnois who were killed protecting the trees were buried in Khejarli, where a simple grave with four pillars was erected. Every year, in September, i.e., Shukla Dashmi of Bhadrapad (Hindi month) the Bishnois assemble there to commemorate the sacrifice made by their people to preserve the trees.

The field developed during the 18th century, especially in Prussia and France where scientific forestry methods were developed. These methods were first applied rigorously in British India from the early 19th century. The government was interested in the use of forest produce and began managing the forests with measures to reduce the risk of wildfire in order to protect the "household" of nature, as it was then termed. This early ecological idea was in order to preserve the growth of delicate teak trees, which was an important resource for the Royal Navy.

Concerns over teak depletion were raised as early as 1799 and 1805 when the Navy was undergoing a massive expansion during the Napoleonic Wars; this pressure led to the first formal conservation Act, which prohibited the felling of small teak trees. The first forestry officer was appointed in 1806 to regulate and preserve the trees necessary for shipbuilding.

This promising start received a setback in the 1820s and 30s, when laissez-faire economics and complaints from private landowners brought these early conservation attempts to an end.

In 1837, American poet George Pope Morris published "Woodman, Spare that Tree!", a Romantic poem urging a lumberjack to avoid an oak tree that has sentimental value. The poem was set to music later that year by Henry Russell. Lines from the song have been quoted by environmentalists.

=== Origins of the modern conservation movement ===
Conservation was revived in the mid-19th century, with the first practical application of scientific conservation principles to the forests of India. The conservation ethic that began to evolve included three core principles: that human activity damaged the environment, that there was a civic duty to maintain the environment for future generations, and that scientific, empirically based methods should be applied to ensure this duty was carried out. Sir James Ranald Martin was prominent in promoting this ideology, publishing many medico-topographical reports that demonstrated the scale of damage wrought through large-scale deforestation and desiccation, and lobbying extensively for the institutionalization of forest conservation activities in British India through the establishment of Forest Departments. Edward Percy Stebbing warned of desertification of India. The Madras Board of Revenue started local conservation efforts in 1842, headed by Alexander Gibson, a professional botanist who systematically adopted a forest conservation program based on scientific principles. This was the first case of state management of forests in the world.

These local attempts gradually received more attention by the British government as the unregulated felling of trees continued unabated. In 1850, the British Association in Edinburgh formed a committee to study forest destruction at the behest of Hugh Cleghorn a pioneer in the nascent conservation movement.

He had become interested in forest conservation in Mysore in 1847 and gave several lectures at the Association on the failure of agriculture in India. These lectures influenced the government under Governor-General Lord Dalhousie to introduce the first permanent and large-scale forest conservation program in the world in 1855, a model that soon spread to other colonies, as well the United States. In the same year, Cleghorn organised the Madras Forest Department and in 1860 the department banned the use shifting cultivation. Cleghorn's 1861 manual, The forests and gardens of South India, became the definitive work on the subject and was widely used by forest assistants in the subcontinent. In 1861, the Forest Department extended its remit into the Punjab.

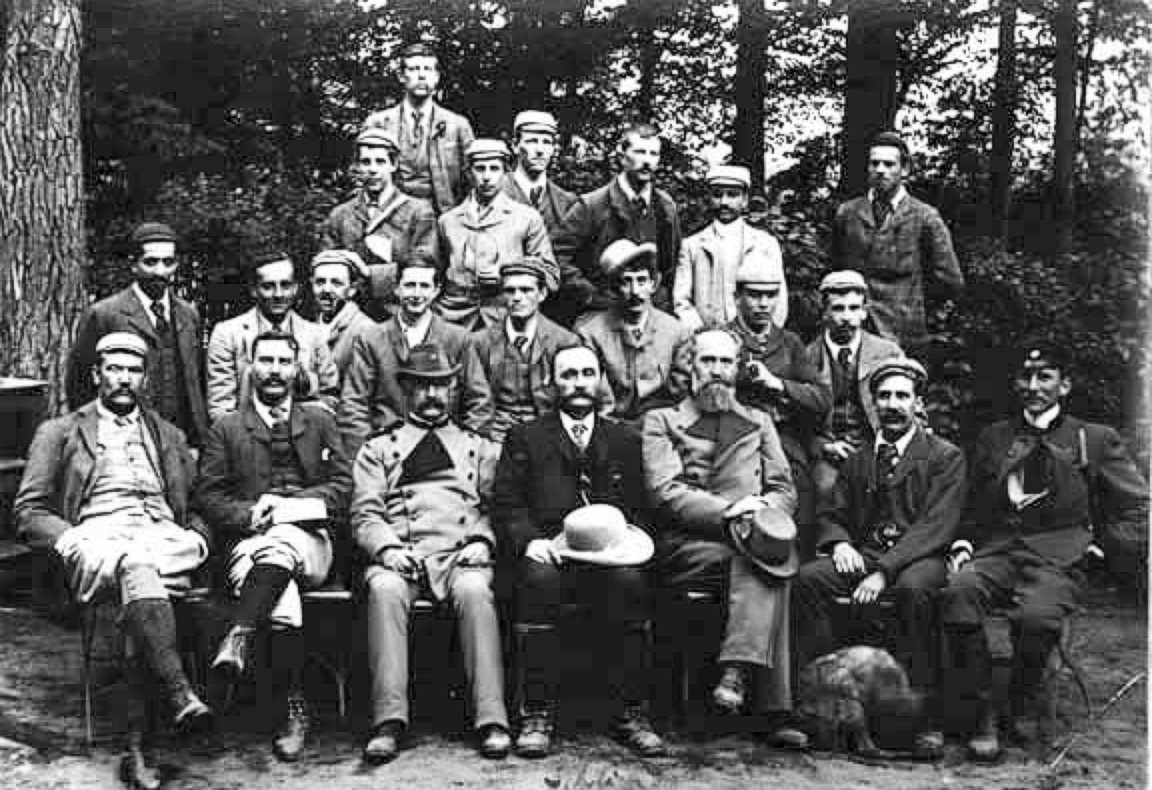
Schlich, in the middle of the seated row, with students from the forestry school at Oxford, on a visit to the forests of Saxony in the year 1892

Sir Dietrich Brandis, a German forester, joined the British service in 1856 as superintendent of the teak forests of Pegu division in eastern Burma. During that time Burma's teak forests were controlled by militant Karen tribals. He introduced the "taungya" system, in which Karen villagers provided labor for clearing, planting and weeding teak plantations. After seven years in Burma, Brandis was appointed Inspector General of Forests in India, a position he served in for 20 years. He formulated new forest legislation and helped establish research and training institutions. The Imperial Forest School at Dehradun was founded by him.

Germans were prominent in the forestry administration of British India. As well as Brandis, Berthold Ribbentrop and Sir William P.D. Schlich brought new methods to Indian conservation, the latter becoming the Inspector-General in 1883 after Brandis stepped down. Schlich helped to establish the journal Indian Forester in 1874, and became the founding director of the first forestry school in England at Cooper's Hill in 1885. He authored the five-volume Manual of Forestry (1889–96) on silviculture, forest management, forest protection, and forest utilization, which became the standard and enduring textbook for forestry students.

=== Conservation in the United States ===
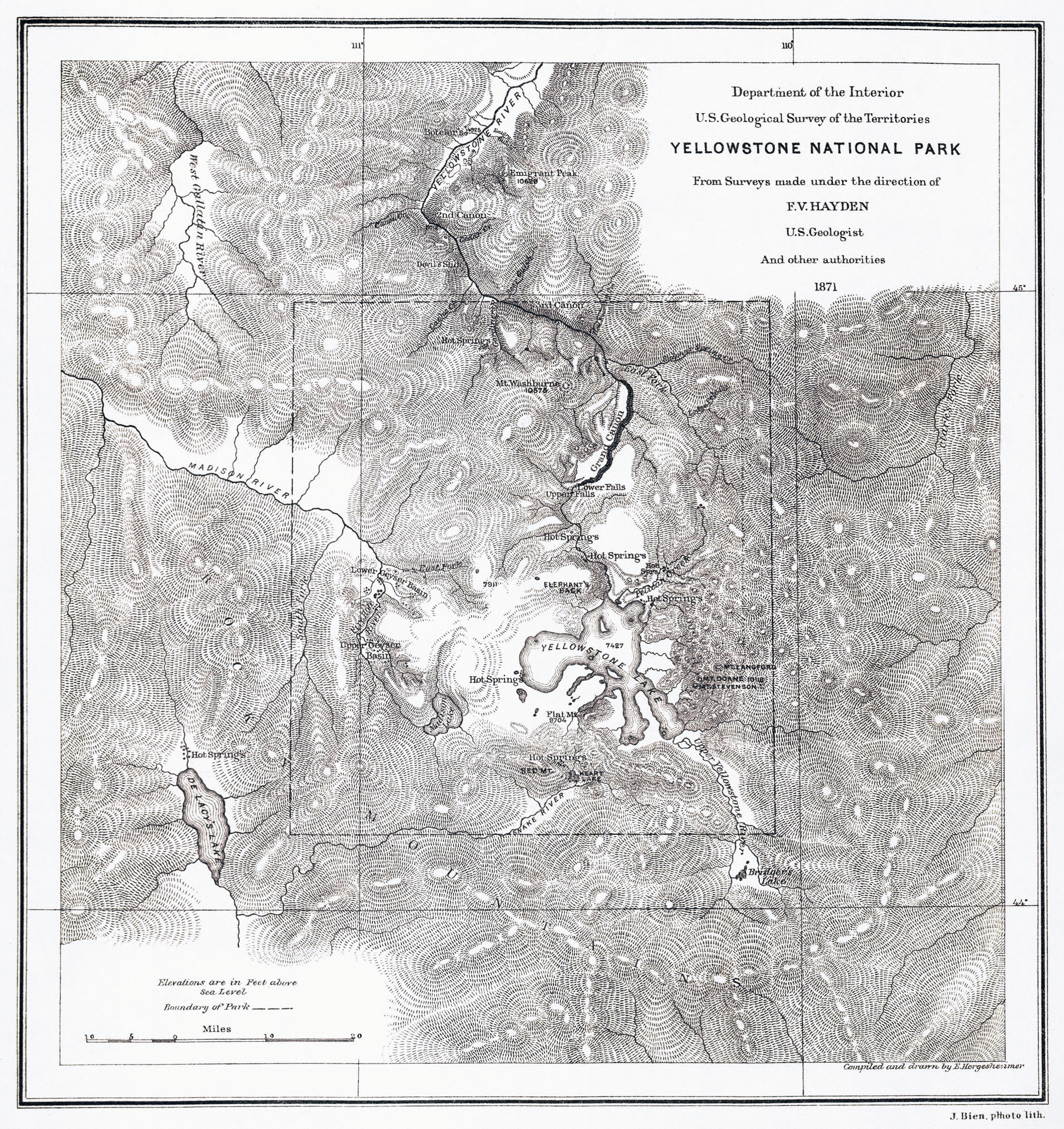
F. V. Hayden's map of Yellowstone National Park, 1871

The American movement received its inspiration from 19th century works that exalted the inherent value of nature, quite apart from human usage. Author Henry David Thoreau (1817–1862) made key philosophical contributions that exalted nature. Thoreau was interested in peoples' relationship with nature and studied this by living close to nature in a simple life. He published his experiences in the book Walden, which argued that people should become intimately close with nature. The ideas of Sir Brandis, Sir William P.D. Schlich and Carl A. Schenck were also very influential—Gifford Pinchot, the first chief of the USDA Forest Service, relied heavily upon Brandis' advice for introducing professional forest management in the U.S. and on how to structure the Forest Service. In 1864 Abraham Lincoln established the federally preserved Yosemite, before the first national park was created (Yellowstone National Park).

Both conservationists and preservationists appeared in political debates during the Progressive Era (the 1890s–early 1920s). There were three main positions.

- Laissez-faire: The laissez-faire position held that owners of private property, including lumber and mining companies, should be allowed to do anything they wished on their properties. Environmental protection therefore becomes their choice. Businesses are pressured somewhat by the incentive of occupational preservation which requires that they not wholly destroy or consume the resources they rely upon. Said businesses need to innovate or pivot in the event that the exhaustion of a resource is imminent.
- Conservationists: The conservationists, led by future President Theodore Roosevelt and his close ally George Bird Grinnell, were motivated by the wanton waste that was taking place at the hand of market forces, including logging and hunting. This practice resulted in placing a large number of North American game species on the edge of extinction. Roosevelt believed that the laissez-faire approach of the U.S. Government was too wasteful and inefficient. In any case, they noted, most of the natural resources in the western states were already owned by the federal government. The best course of action, they argued, was a long-term plan devised by national experts to maximize the long-term economic benefits of natural resources. To accomplish the mission, Roosevelt and Grinnell formed the Boone and Crockett Club, whose members were some of the best minds and influential men of the day. Its contingency of conservationists, scientists, politicians, and intellectuals became Roosevelt's closest advisers during his march to preserve wildlife and habitat across North America.
- Preservationists: Preservationists, led by John Muir (1838–1914), argued that the conservation policies were not strong enough to protect the interest of the natural world because they continued to focus on the natural world as a source of economic production.

The debate between conservation and preservation reached its peak in the public debates over the construction of California's Hetch Hetchy dam in Yosemite National Park which supplies the water supply of San Francisco. Muir, leading the Sierra Club, declared that the valley must be preserved for the sake of its beauty: "No holier temple has ever been consecrated by the heart of man."

President Roosevelt put conservationist issues high on the national agenda. He worked with all the major figures of the movement, especially his chief advisor on the matter, Gifford Pinchot and was deeply committed to conserving natural resources. He encouraged the Newlands Reclamation Act of 1902 to promote federal construction of dams to irrigate small farms and placed 230 million acres (360,000 mi^{2}; 930,000 km^{2}) under federal protection. Roosevelt set aside more federal land for national parks and nature preserves than all of his predecessors combined.

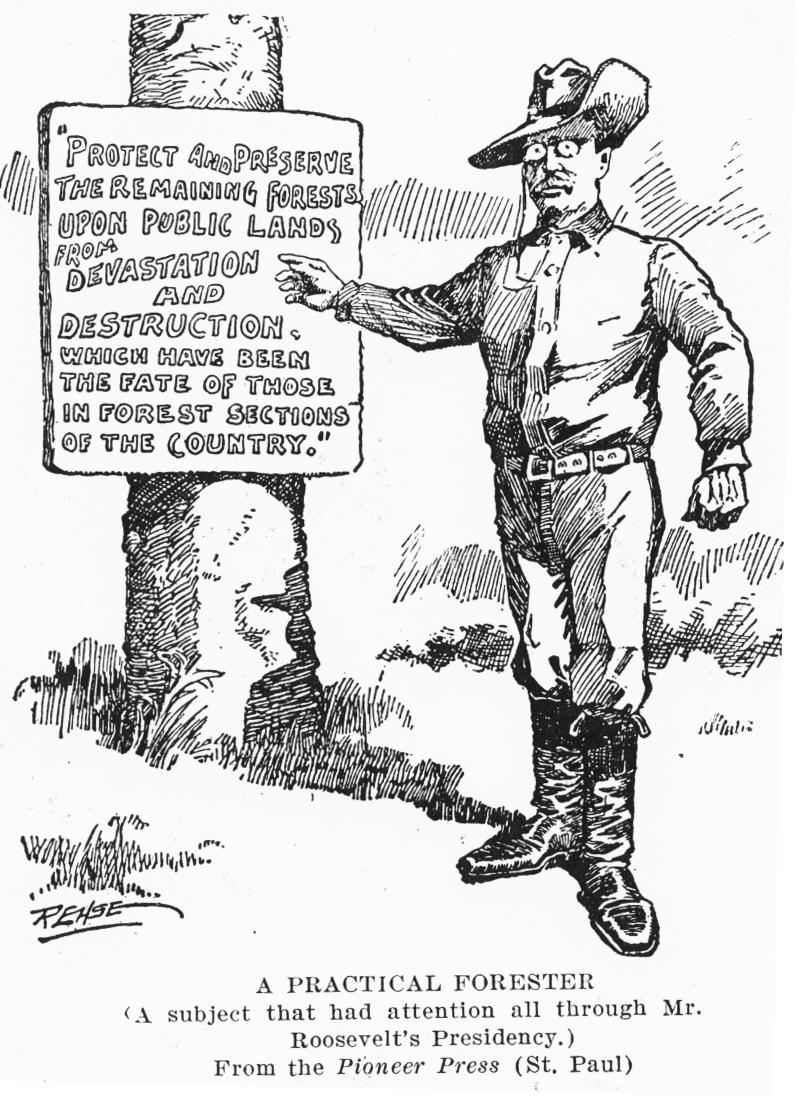
Roosevelt was a leader in conservation, fighting to end the waste of natural resources.

Roosevelt established the United States Forest Service, signed into law the creation of five national parks, and signed the year 1906 Antiquities Act, under which he proclaimed 18 new national monuments. He also established the first 51 bird reserves, four game preserves, and 150 national forests, including Shoshone National Forest, the nation's first. The area of the United States that he placed under public protection totals approximately 230,000,000 acres (930,000 km^{2}).

Gifford Pinchot had been appointed by McKinley as chief of Division of Forestry in the Department of Agriculture. In 1905, his department gained control of the national forest reserves. Pinchot promoted private use (for a fee) under federal supervision. In 1907, Roosevelt designated 16 million acres (65,000 km^{2}) of new national forests just minutes before a deadline.

In May 1908, Roosevelt sponsored the Conference of Governors held in the White House, with a focus on natural resources and their most efficient use. Roosevelt delivered the opening address: "Conservation as a National Duty".

In 1903 Roosevelt toured the Yosemite Valley with John Muir, who had a very different view of conservation, and tried to minimize commercial use of water resources and forests. Working through the Sierra Club he founded, Muir succeeded in 1905 in having Congress transfer the Mariposa Grove and Yosemite Valley to the federal government. While Muir wanted nature preserved for its own sake, Roosevelt subscribed to Pinchot's formulation, "to make the forest produce the largest amount of whatever crop or service will be most useful, and keep on producing it for generation after generation of men and trees."

Theodore Roosevelt's view on conservationism remained dominant for decades; Franklin D. Roosevelt authorised the building of many large-scale dams and water projects, as well as the expansion of the National Forest System to buy out sub-marginal farms. In 1937, the Pittman–Robertson Federal Aid in Wildlife Restoration Act was signed into law, providing funding for state agencies to carry out their conservation efforts.

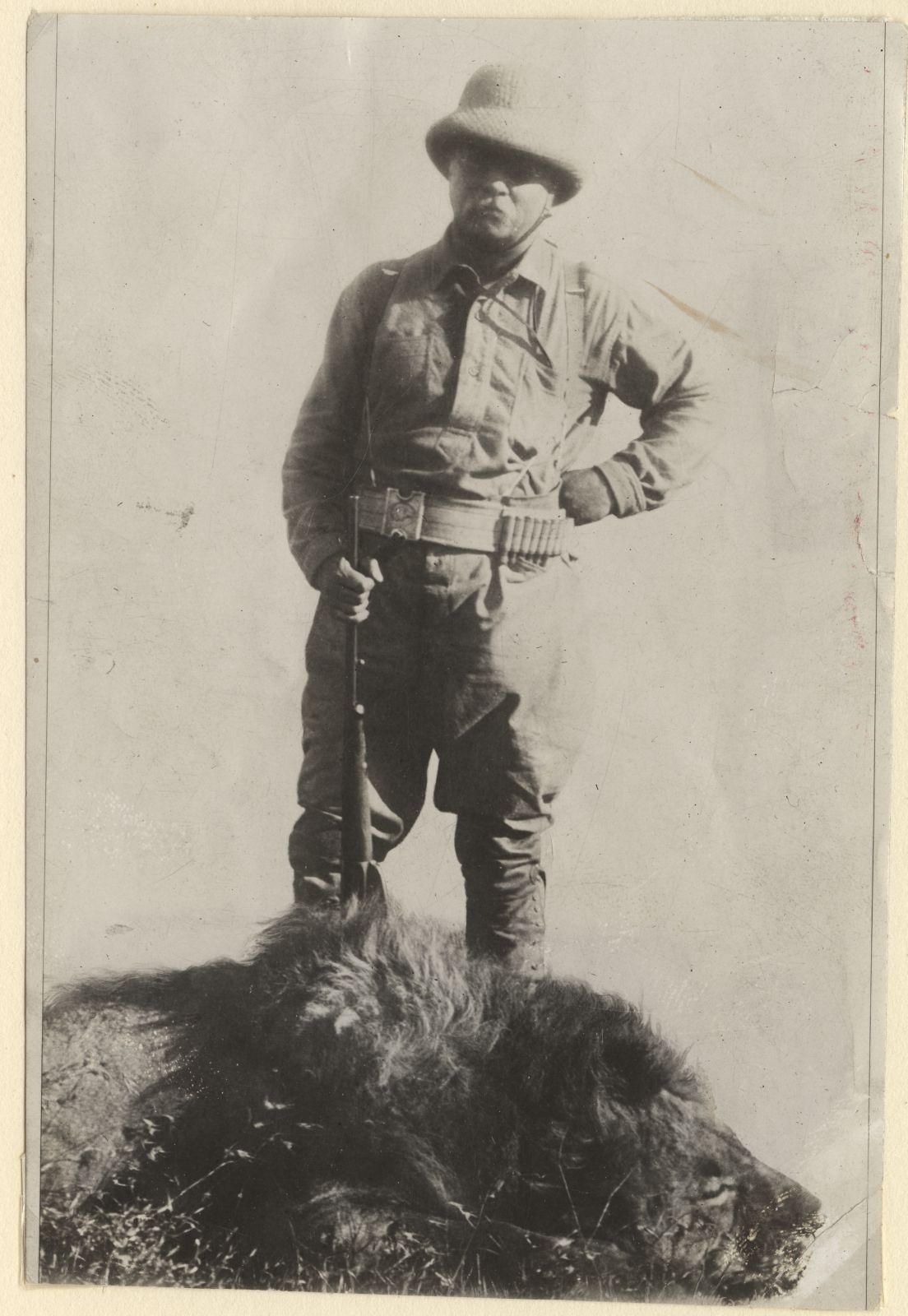
Theodore Roosevelt with trophy killing

==== Since 1970 ====
Environmental issues reemerged on the national agenda in 1970, with Republican Richard Nixon playing a major role, especially with his creation of the Environmental Protection Agency. The debates over the public lands and environmental politics played a supporting role in the decline of liberalism and the rise of modern environmentalism. Although Americans consistently rank environmental issues as "important", polling data indicates that in the voting booth voters rank the environmental issues low relative to other political concerns.

The growth of the Republican party's political power in the inland West (apart from the Pacific coast) was facilitated by the rise of popular opposition to public lands reform. Successful Democrats in the inland West and Alaska typically take more conservative positions on environmental issues than Democrats from the Coastal states. Conservatives drew on new organizational networks of think tanks, industry groups, and citizen-oriented organizations, and they began to deploy new strategies that affirmed the rights of individuals to their property, protection of extraction rights, to hunt and recreate, and to pursue happiness unencumbered by the federal government at the expense of resource conservation.

In 2019, convivial conservation was an idea proposed by Bram Büscher and Robert Fletcher. Convivial conservation draws on social movements and concepts like environmental justice and structural change to create a post-capitalist approach to conservation. Convivial conservation rejects both human-nature dichotomies and capitalistic political economies. Built on a politics of equity, structural change and environmental justice, convivial conservation is considered a radical theory as it focuses on the structural political-economy of modern nation states and the need to create structural change. Convivial conservation creates a more integrated approach which reconfigures the nature-human configuration to create a world in which humans are recognized as a part of nature. The emphasis on nature as for and by humans creates a human responsibility to care for the environment as a way of caring for themselves. It also redefines nature as not only being pristine and untouched, but cultivated by humans in everyday formats. The theory is a long-term process of structural change to move away from capitalist valuation in favor of a system emphasizing everyday and local living. Convivial conservation creates a nature which includes humans rather than excluding them from the necessity of conservation. While other conservation theories integrate some of the elements of convivial conservation, none move away from both dichotomies and capitalist valuation principles.

===== The five elements of convivial conservation =====
1. The promotion of nature for, to and by humans
2. The movement away from the concept of conservation as saving only nonhuman nature
3. Emphasis on the long-term democratic engagement with nature rather than elite access and tourism,
4. The movement away from the spectacle of nature and instead focusing on the mundane 'everyday nature'
5. The democratic management of nature, with nature as commons and in context

=== Racism and the conservation movement ===
The early years of the environmental and conservation movements were rooted in the safeguarding of game to support the recreation activities of elite white men, such as sport hunting. This led to an economy to support and perpetuate these activities as well as the continued wilderness conservation to support the corporate interests supplying the hunters with the equipment needed for their sport. Game parks in England and the United States allowed wealthy hunters and fishermen to deplete wildlife, while hunting by Indigenous groups, laborers and the working class, and poor citizens - especially for the express use of sustenance - was vigorously monitored. Scholars have shown that the establishment of the U.S. national parks, while setting aside land for preservation, was also a continuation of preserving the land for the recreation and enjoyment of elite white hunters and nature enthusiasts. Recreation in these spaces is and was not available to everyone. Creation of such recreational spaces involved the dispossession and removal of Native peoples. In the late 19th and early 20th centuries, Jim Crow segregation laws determined which groups were welcomed in public lands. African Americans living in the Jim Crow South were granted almost no access to state parks and limited to segregated spaces that were unequal in size, quality, and location compared to spaces available to white visitors.

While Theodore Roosevelt was one of the leading activists for the conservation movement in the United States, he also believed that the threats to the natural world were equally threats to white Americans. Roosevelt and his contemporaries held the belief that the cities, industries and factories that were overtaking the wilderness and threatening the native plants and animals were also consuming and threatening the racial vigor that they believed white Americans held which made them superior. Roosevelt was a big believer that white male virility depended on wildlife for its vigor, and that, consequently, depleting wildlife would result in a racially weaker nation. This lead Roosevelt to support the passing of many immigration restrictions, eugenics legislations and wildlife preservation laws. For instance, Roosevelt established the first national parks through the Antiquities Act of 1906 while also endorsing the removal of Indigenous Americans from their tribal lands within the parks. This move was promoted and endorsed by other leaders of the conservation movement, including Frederick Law Olmsted, a leading landscape architect, conservationist, and supporter of the national park system, and Gifford Pinchot, a leading eugenicist and conservationist. Furthering the economic exploitation of the environment and national parks for wealthy whites was the beginning of ecotourism in the parks, which included allowing some Indigenous Americans to remain so that the tourists could get what was to be considered the full "wilderness experience".

Another long-term supporter, partner, and inspiration to Roosevelt, Madison Grant, was a well known American eugenicist and conservationist. Grant worked alongside Roosevelt in the American conservation movement and was even secretary and president of the Boone and Crockett Club. In 1916, Grant published the book The Passing of the Great Race, or The Racial Basis of European History, which based its premise on eugenics and outlined a hierarchy of races, with white, "Nordic" men at the top, and all other races below. The German translation of this book was used by Nazi Germany as the source for many of their beliefs and was even proclaimed by Hitler to be his "Bible".

One of the first established conservation agencies in the United States is the National Audubon Society. Founded in 1905, its priority was to protect and conserve various waterbird species. However, the first state-level Audubon group was created in 1896 by Harriet Hemenway and Minna B. Hall to convince women to refrain from buying hats made with bird feathers- a common practice at the time. The organization is named after John Audubon, a naturalist and legendary bird painter. Audubon was also a slaveholder who also included many racist tales in his books. Despite his views of racial inequality, Audubon did find black and Indigenous people to be scientifically useful, often using their local knowledge in his books and relying on them to collect specimens for him.

The legacies of Roosevelt and Audubon entrenched exclusion into systems of power that shape which groups are involved in conservation today. In a survey done by Green 2.0, a nonprofit that focuses on diversification, sociologists found that within the NGOs that participated, "88% of staff and 95% of boards were white." This lack of diversity is augmented by barriers that prevent minority groups from equal access to conservation spaces. Research shows that limited participation in these spaces is largely due to limited socioeconomic resources, cultural factors, and discrimination. These barriers are shaped by historical processes, such as redlining and segregation, which confined communities of color to areas with fewer parks, more environmental problems, and less access to outdoor spaces. This uneven access helps to explain why many of these conservation spaces are often described as "white spaces". While such barriers to access can limit how much time one spends outdoors, they can also "impair the acquisition of early formative experiences that carry over into adulthood"; this is critical for establishing a meaningful relationship with nature. Addressing these barriers to access could provide a meaningful solution to diversifying the broader conservation movement. New research shows that nature-based recreation could be a promising pathway towards greater involvement with environmental stewardship. Expanding access to nature, especially for youth, can help increase the likelihood of engagement with the environment to create a more inclusive and diverse conservation movement.

The ideology of the conservation movement in Germany paralleled that of the U.S. and England. Early German naturalists of the 20th century turned to the wilderness to escape the industrialization of cities. However, many of these early conservationists became part of and influenced the Nazi party. Like elite and influential Americans of the early 20th century, they embraced eugenics and racism and promoted the idea that Nordic people are superior.

=== Conservation in Costa Rica ===
Figure 1. Costa Rica divided into different areas of conservation

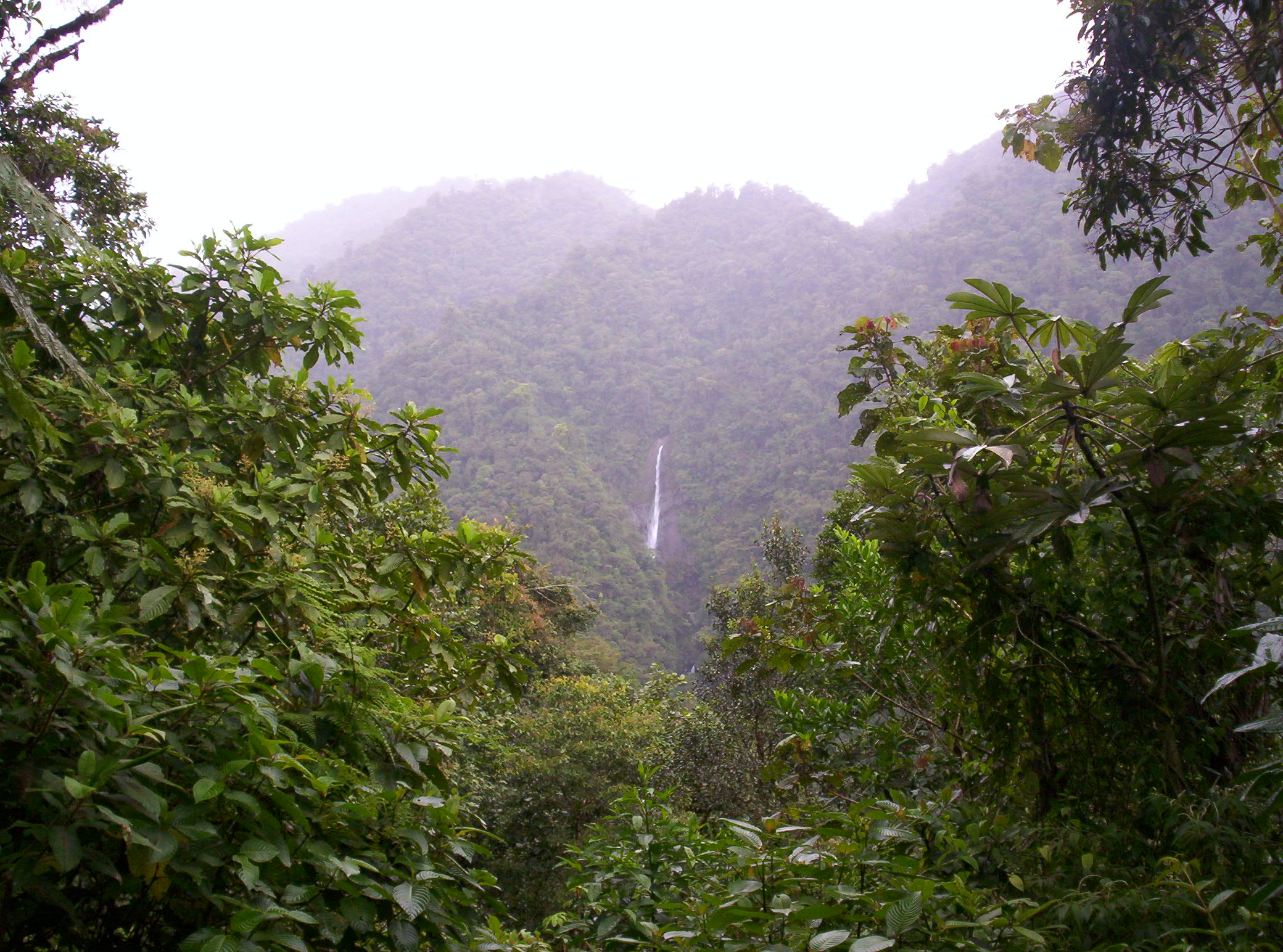
Tapantí National Park

Although the conservation movement developed in Europe in the 18th century, Costa Rica as a country has been heralded its champion in the current times. Costa Rica hosts an astonishing number of species, given its size, having more animal and plant species than the US and Canada combined hosting over 500,000 species of plants and animals. Despite this, Costa Rica is only 250 miles long and 150 miles wide. A widely accepted theory for the origin of this unusual density of species is the free mixing of species from both North and South America occurring on this "inter-oceanic" and "inter-continental" landscape. Preserving the natural environment of this fragile landscape, therefore, has drawn the attention of many international scholars and scientists.

MINAE (Ministry of Environment, Energy and Telecommunications) and its responsible for many conservation efforts in Costa Rica it achieves through its many agencies, including SINAC (National System of Conservation Areas), FONAFIFO (national forest fund), and CONAGEBIO (National Commission for Biodiversity Management).

Costa Rica has made conservation a national priority, and has been at the forefront of preserving its natural environment with 28% of its land protected in the form of national parks, reserves, and wildlife refuges, which is under the administrative control of SINAC (National System of Conservation Areas) a division of MINAE (Ministry of Environment, Energy and Telecommunications). SINAC has subdivided the country into various zones depending on the ecological diversity of that region - as seen in figure 1. The country has used this ecological diversity to its economic advantage in the form of a thriving ecotourism industry, putting its commitment to nature, on display to visitors from across the globe. The tourism market in Costa Rica is estimated to grow by USD 1.34 billion from 2023 to 2028, growing at a CAGR of 5.76%.

It is also the only country in the world that generates more than 99% of its electricity from renewable sources, relying on hydropower (72%), wind (13%), geothermal energy (15%), biomass and solar (1%). Critics have pointed out however, that in achieving this milestone, the country has built several dams (providing the bulk of its electricity) some of which have negatively impacted indigenous communities as well as the local flora and fauna.

=== World Wide Fund for Nature ===
You know, when we first set up WWF, our objective was to save endangered species from extinction. But we have failed completely; we haven't managed to save a single one. If only we had put all that money into condoms, we might have done some good.

— Sir Peter Scott, Founder of the World Wide Fund for Nature, Cosmos Magazine, 2010

The World Wide Fund for Nature (WWF) is an international non-governmental organization founded in 1961, working in the field of the wilderness preservation, and the reduction of human impact on the environment. It was formerly named the "World Wildlife Fund", which remains its official name in Canada and the United States.

WWF is the world's largest conservation organization with over five million supporters worldwide, working in more than 100 countries, supporting around 1,300 conservation and environmental projects. They have invested over $1 billion in more than 12,000 conservation initiatives since 1995. WWF is a foundation with 55% of funding from individuals and bequests, 19% from government sources (such as the World Bank, DFID, USAID) and 8% from corporations in 2014.

WWF aims to "stop the degradation of the planet's natural environment and to build a future in which humans live in harmony with nature." The Living Planet Report is published every two years by WWF since 1998; it is based on a Living Planet Index and ecological footprint calculation. In addition, WWF has launched several notable worldwide campaigns including Earth Hour and Debt-for-Nature Swap, and its current work is organized around these six areas: food, climate, freshwater, wildlife, forests, and oceans.

==== "Conservation Far" approach ====
Institutions such as the WWF have historically been the cause of the displacement and divide between Indigenous populations and the lands they inhabit. The reason is the organization's historically colonial, paternalistic, and neoliberal approaches to conservation. Claus, in her article "Drawing the Sea Near: Satoumi and Coral Reef Conservation in Okinawa", expands on this approach, called "conservation far", in which access to lands is open to external foreign entities, such as researchers or tourists, but prohibited to local populations. The conservation initiatives are therefore taking place "far" away. This entity is largely unaware of the customs and values held by those within the territory surrounding nature and their role within it.

==== "Conservation near" approach ====
In Japan, the town of Shiraho had traditional ways of tending to nature that were lost due to colonization and militarization by the United States. The return to traditional sustainability practices constituted a "conservation near" approach. This engages those near in proximity to the lands in the conservation efforts and holds them accountable for their direct effects on its preservation. While conservation-far drills visuals and sight as being the main interaction medium between people and the environment, conservation near includes a hands-on, full sensory experience permitted by conservation-near methodologies. An emphasis on observation only stems from a deeper association with intellect and observation. The alternative to this is more of a bodily or "primitive" consciousness, which is associated with lower-intelligence and people of color. A new, integrated approach to conservation is being investigated in recent years by institutions such as WWF. The socionatural relationships centered on the interactions based in reciprocity and empathy, making conservation efforts being accountable to the local community and ways of life, changing in response to values, ideals, and beliefs of the locals. Japanese seascapes are often integral to the identity of the residents and includes historical memories and spiritual engagements which need to be recognized and considered. The involvement of communities gives residents a stake in the issue, leading to a long-term solution which emphasizes sustainable resource usage and the empowerment of the communities. Conservation efforts are able to take into consideration cultural values rather than the foreign ideals that are often imposed by foreign activists.

== Evidence-based conservation ==
Evidence-based conservation is the application of evidence in conservation biology and environmental management actions and policy making. It is defined as systematically assessing scientific information from published, peer-reviewed publications and texts, practitioners' experiences, independent expert assessment, and local and indigenous knowledge on a specific conservation topic. This includes assessing the current effectiveness of different management interventions, threats and emerging problems and economic factors.

Evidence-based conservation was organized based on the observations that decision making in conservation was based on intuition and or practitioner experience often disregarding other forms of evidence of successes and failures (e.g. scientific information). This has led to costly and poor outcomes. Evidence-based conservation provides access to information that will support decision making through an evidence-based framework of "what works" in conservation.

The evidence-based approach to conservation is based on evidence-based practice which started in medicine and later spread to nursing, education, psychology and other fields. It is part of the larger movement towards evidence-based practices.

== Areas of concern ==
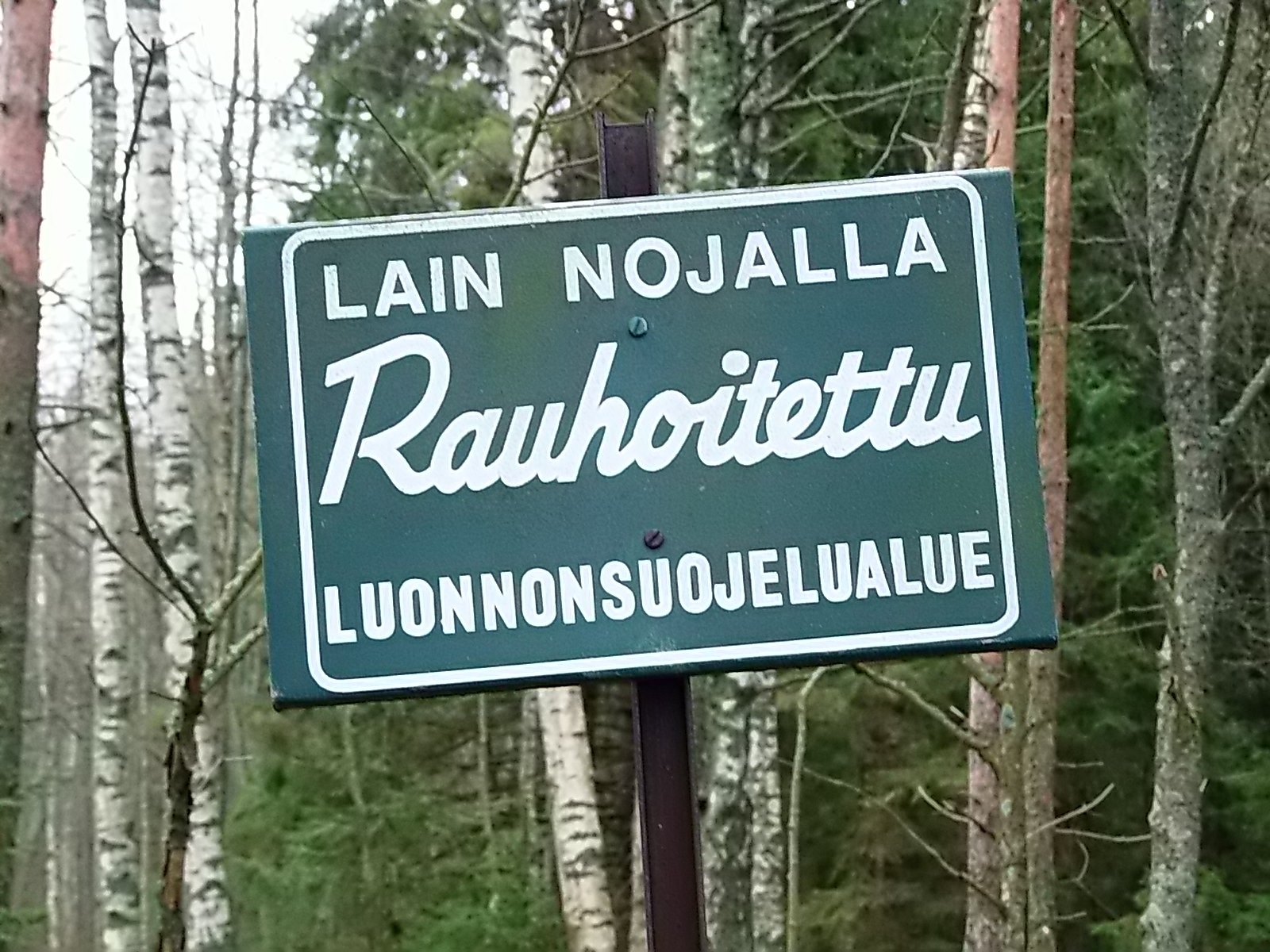
A conservation area's sign in the Finnish forest. It says, "A conservation area protected by law".

Deforestation and overpopulation are issues affecting all regions of the world. The consequent destruction of wildlife habitat has prompted the creation of conservation groups in other countries, some founded by local hunters who have witnessed declining wildlife populations first hand. Also, it was highly important for the conservation movement to solve problems of living conditions in the cities and the overpopulation of such places.

=== Boreal forest and the Arctic ===
The idea of incentive conservation is a modern one but its practice has clearly defended some of the sub Arctic wildernesses and the wildlife in those regions for thousands of years, especially by indigenous peoples such as the Evenk, Yakut, Sami, Inuit and Cree. The fur trade and hunting by these peoples have preserved these regions for thousands of years. Ironically, the pressure now upon them comes from non-renewable resources such as oil, sometimes to make synthetic clothing which is advocated as a humane substitute for fur. (See Raccoon dog for case study of the conservation of an animal through fur trade.) Similarly, in the case of the beaver, hunting and fur trade were thought to bring about the animal's demise, when in fact they were an integral part of its conservation. For many years children's books stated and still do, that the decline in the beaver population was due to the fur trade. In reality however, the decline in beaver numbers was because of habitat destruction and deforestation, as well as its continued persecution as a pest (it causes flooding). In Cree lands, however, where the population valued the animal for meat and fur, it continued to thrive. The Inuit defend their relationship with the seal in response to outside critics.

=== Latin America ===
==== Bolivia ====
The Izoceño-Guaraní of Santa Cruz Department, Bolivia, is a tribe of hunters who were influential in establishing the Capitania del Alto y Bajo Isoso (CABI). CABI promotes economic growth and survival of the Izoceno people while discouraging the rapid destruction of habitat within Bolivia's Gran Chaco. They are responsible for the creation of the 34,000 square kilometre Kaa-Iya del Gran Chaco National Park and Integrated Management Area (KINP). The KINP protects the most biodiverse portion of the Gran Chaco, an ecoregion shared with Argentina, Paraguay and Brazil. In 1996, the Wildlife Conservation Society joined forces with CABI to institute wildlife and hunting monitoring programs in 23 Izoceño communities. The partnership combines traditional beliefs and local knowledge with the political and administrative tools needed to effectively manage habitats. The programs rely solely on voluntary participation by local hunters who perform self-monitoring techniques and keep records of their hunts. The information obtained by the hunters participating in the program has provided CABI with important data required to make educated decisions about the use of the land. Hunters have been willing participants in this program because of pride in their traditional activities, encouragement by their communities and expectations of benefits to the area.

==== Peru ====
Government conservation has played a large part in preventing further degradation of the Amazon. However, the increased involvement of private actors has helped transform the fight for ecological preservation. In 2000 Peru began allowing NGOs to take over unmanaged forest areas for 40-year stints, becoming the first country to do so. Previously, Peru had slowly ceded land to logging and exploitative industries in an effort to keep them off government managed land. After the law change 2000 private individuals have business on the conservation lands if they provide a path and plan to continue the conservation. As of 2015, there were 600,000 acres in Peru dedicated to ecotourism. Specifically, the Los Amigos Conservation Concession was the first in the world and through its public-private partnership model has helped preserve over 1100 acres in Peru. Although, rising crime and government instability in recent years has threatened Peru's current and past conservation efforts.

=== Africa ===
==== Botswana ====
In order to discourage illegal South African hunting parties and ensure future local use and sustainability, indigenous hunters in Botswana began lobbying for and implementing conservation practices in the 1960s. The Fauna Preservation Society of Ngamiland (FPS) was formed in 1962 by the husband and wife team: Robert Kay and June Kay, environmentalists working in conjunction with the Batawana tribes to preserve wildlife habitat.

The FPS promotes habitat conservation and provides local education for preservation of wildlife. Conservation initiatives were met with strong opposition from the Botswana government because of the monies tied to big-game hunting. In 1963, BaTawanga Chiefs and tribal hunter/adventurers in conjunction with the FPS founded Moremi National Park and Wildlife Refuge, the first area to be set aside by tribal people rather than governmental forces. Moremi National Park is home to a variety of wildlife, including lions, giraffes, elephants, buffalo, zebra, cheetahs and antelope, and covers an area of 3,000 square kilometers. Most of the groups involved with establishing this protected land were involved with hunting and were motivated by their personal observations of declining wildlife and habitat.

==== South Africa ====
South Africa has been an example of where conservation has experienced some success and setbacks due to the prevalence of poaching and government ineffectiveness. Private landowners in South Africa support the largest number of white rhinos on the continent. Meanwhile, state-run parks such as Kruger National Park has seen declining numbers due to poaching. Black and white rhino populations in the national park have declined by 71% and 68% over the past decade as of 2021. Project Southern Cross has set up Integrated Wildlife Zones to help reserves coordinate on their conservation efforts. Some successful examples of South African conservation include the Shamwari Private Game Reserve and the Wildlife Rehabilitation Centre. The Shamwari Private Game Reserve, started in 1992 is home to populations of lion, rhinoceros, buffalo, leopard, and elephant. While the rehabilitation centre focuses on new ways to nurse injured animals so they can return to the wild.

==== Zimbabwe ====
A combination of private and community conservation has been at the forefront of maintaining ecological diversity and preserving endangered species in Zimbabwe. Also, Hwange National Park (HNP) is about the size of Belgium and is home to 45,000 elephants. Poaching has also declined over the last decade but high-profile and serial poachers continue to put pressure on the elephant population. Black rhinos explicitly were saved from extinction in the 1990s by moving black rhinos to private lands. On the Savé Valley and Bubiana conservancies not a single rhino has been poached and their numbers are growing for the first time in decades. In 1970 rhino numbers were at 65,000 and had collapsed to 2,400 by 1995. Communal and resettlement lands that are some of the poorest in Zimbabwe surround the private conservancy lands, their success requires close work with these communities. NGOs such as the African Wildlife Foundation have successfully worked with Zimbabwe's government to integrate its conservation efforts with local communities. As a result, poaching has decreased and populations have rebounded.

== See also ==
- Air pollution in the United Kingdom
- Air pollution in the United States
- Australian Grains Genebank
- Conservation biology
- Conservation ethic
- Ecology
- Ecology movement
- Energy conservation
- Environmental history
- Environmental history of the United States
- Environmental movement
- Environmental protection
- Environmentalism
- Evolution of the Conservation Movement, 1850–1920
- Factor 10
- Forest protection
- Habitat conservation
- History of environmentalism in Germany
- List of environmental organizations
- List of environment topics
- Marine conservation
- Natural environment
- Natural landscape
- Soil conservation
- Sustainability
- Timeline of history of environmentalism
- U.S. National Park Service
- Water conservation
- Wetland conservation
- Wildlife conservation
- Wildlife management
