= Šumarski list =

- Language: Croatian
- Edited by: Boris Hrašovec

Publication details
- History: 1877-present
- Publisher: Croatian Forestry Society (Croatia)
- Frequency: Monthly

Standard abbreviations
- ISO 4: Šumar. List

Indexing
- ISSN: 0373-1332

Links
- Journal homepage

Šumarski list is one of the oldest, still-publishing forestry journals in the world. It was established in October 1876 and is published by the Croatian Forestry Society.

== See also ==
- List of forestry journals
