= Giurgiu (disambiguation) =

Giurgiu is a city in Romania.

Giurgiu may also refer to:

- Giurgiu County, county of Romania
- Giurgiu (Bâsca Mică), a tributary of the river Bâsca Mică in Buzău County, Romania
- Giurgiu, a tributary of the river Zăbala in Vrancea County, Romania
- FC Dunărea Giurgiu, football team from Giurgiu
- FC Astra Giurgiu, football team from Giurgiu

== People with the surname ==
- Gabriel Giurgiu (born 1982), Romanian football player
- Victor Giurgiu (1930 – 2021), Romanian forestry engineer and academic
