= Križevci Cathedral =

Cathedral in Križevci, Croatia

Coordinates: 45.8981°N 16.8433°E

Greek Catholic Cathedral of the Holy Trinity Grkokatolička katedrala Svetog Trojstva
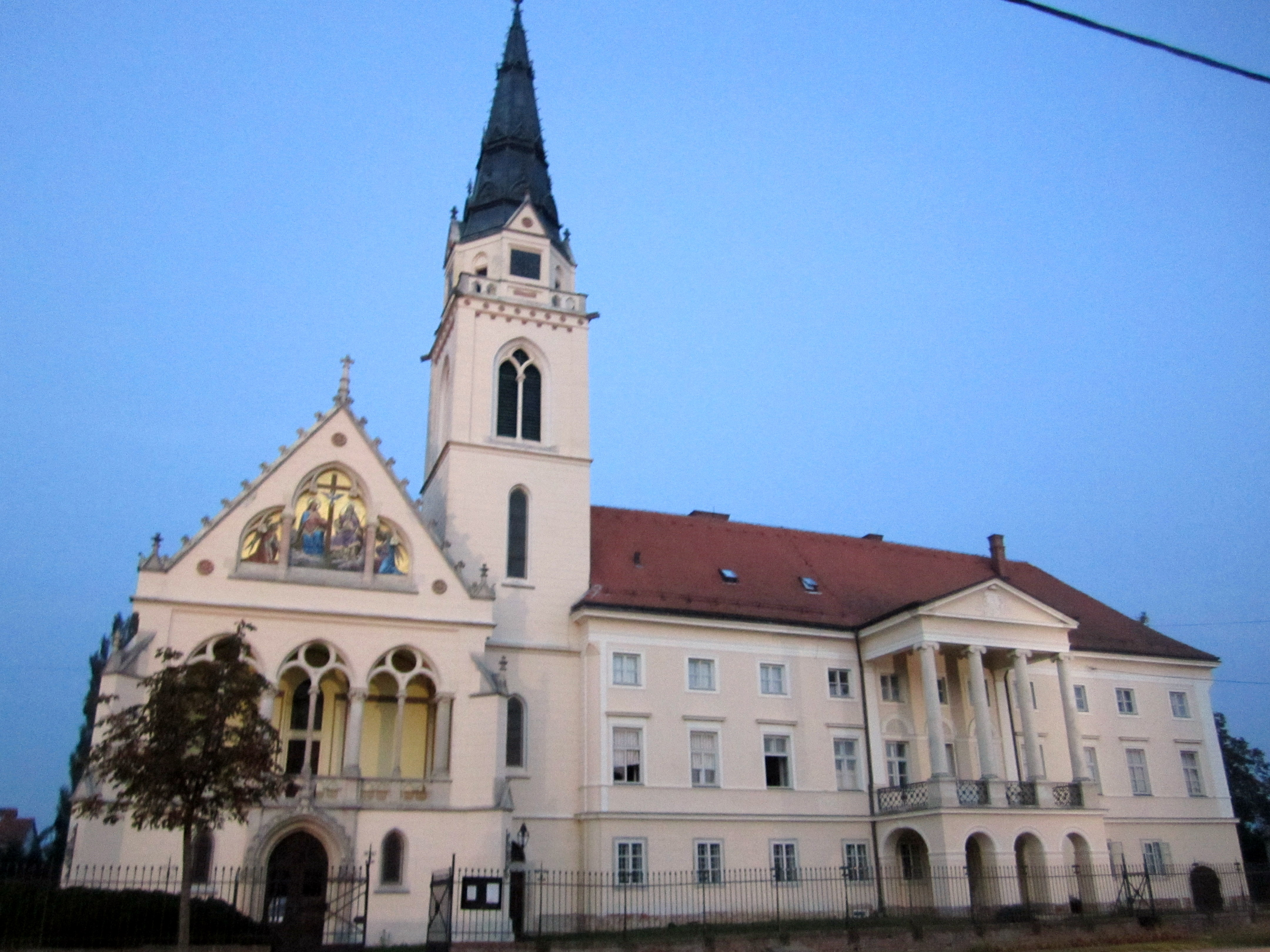
- Križevci Cathedral

Religion
- Affiliation: Greek Catholic
- District: Greek Catholic Eparchy of Križevci
- Ecclesiastical or organizational status: Cathedral
- Patron: Holy Trinity

Location
- Location: Križevci, Croatia
- Interactive map of Greek Catholic Cathedral of the Holy Trinity; Grkokatolička katedrala Svetog Trojstva

Architecture
- Architect: Hermann Bollé
- Type: Church
- Style: Baroque; Neo-Gothic

Specifications
- Length: 38m
- Width: 15.5m
- Width (nave): 8.5m
- Height (max): 15m; 46m (bell tower)

Greek Catholic Cathedral of the Holy Trinity (Croatian: Grkokatolička katedrala Svetog Trojstva) is a Neo-Gothic church in Križevci, Croatia. It is the cathedral of the Greek Catholic Eparchy of Križevci.

== History ==
The cathedral was at first used by the Augustinians (1326-1539), who left it after the Turks burned the monastery, the church and the Križevci Upper Town. They were followed by the Franciscans, who rebuilt the church in 1627 and were using it until 1786 when emperor Joseph II abolished the monastery, and had it assigned to military purposes.

On 17 June 1777 Pope Pius VI founded an eparchy for the Greek Catholics living in the territory of the Kingdom of Croatia; empress Maria Theresa determined that the seat of the newly founded diocese would be in the town of Križevci. Greek Catholics in the Croatian territory were mostly refugees who fled from the Turks and settled in the area of the Military Frontier. In 1791, the existing church become a Greek Catholic cathedral and the bishop's residence. Reconstruction of the church was carried on by bishop Silvije Bubanović, who dedicated it in year 1798.

Since 1801 the Cathedral was gradually renovated in order to be adapted to the needs of the bishops and believers. A thorough renovation took place between 1895 and 1897, during the reign of Bishop Julije Drohobecki, following plans by architect Hermann Bollé. The current Cathedral Neo-Gothic features date from this renovation.

== Architecture ==
The cathedral, featuring a single nave on a Latin cross plan, is 38 meters long, 8.5 meters wide at the nave, while the cross measures 15.5 metres. The cathedral is 15 metres high, while the bell tower has a height of 46 metres. The middle part of the nave has a depression of 15 centimetres, and is separated from the bottom part by an iron fence with four lamps. The vault of the cathedral is painted with stars on a blue background, while the floor is decorated with ceramic tiles.

The lobby is decorated with two paintings by Josip Bauer: at left, Peter's Preaching and the baptism of the first Christians at Pentecost; at right, The Expulsion of Adam and Eve from Paradise; it is separated from the central nave with double doors and a single door on each side. The red trail leads to the middle of the central hall where the marble ambon is placed. Above the latter is a large chandelier, work of master locksmith Đuro Hammel, decorated with paintings of the twelve apostles and the four evangelists made by Josip and Marija Bauer. In front of the ambon is a sacred painting which is kissed by the believers on their arrival at the cathedral. Above the lower part of the nave is the choir. The cathedral has no musical instruments, and songs are sung in the Old Church Slavonic language. On the left side of the nave is the pulpit decorated with paintings of St. John Chrysostom, St. Athanasius of Alexandria and St. Paul the Apostle, all works of Josip Bauer. The wall above the pulpit houses a painting of Jesus' Sermon on the Mount.

The Cathedral contains a crypt, which was used as burial place of numerous priests: they include bishop Silvestar Bubanović, archdeacon Gabre Latković, bishop Konstantin Stanić, provost Marko Badinovac, dean Petar Stić, bishop Gabrijel Smičiklas, provost Janko Goleš, clergyman Konstantin Bukvić, bishop Julije Drohobecki and bishop Janko Šimrak.

The cathedral is also home to a collection of icons with paintings made by painters such as Bela Čikoš Sesija, Ivan Tišov, Ferdo Kovačević, and Celestin Medović. Most responsible for the Cathedral's rich art collection is bishop Julije Drohobeczky. The Cathedral is dedicated to the Holy Trinity.
