= Ferdo Kovačević =

Croatian painter and educator (1870-1927)

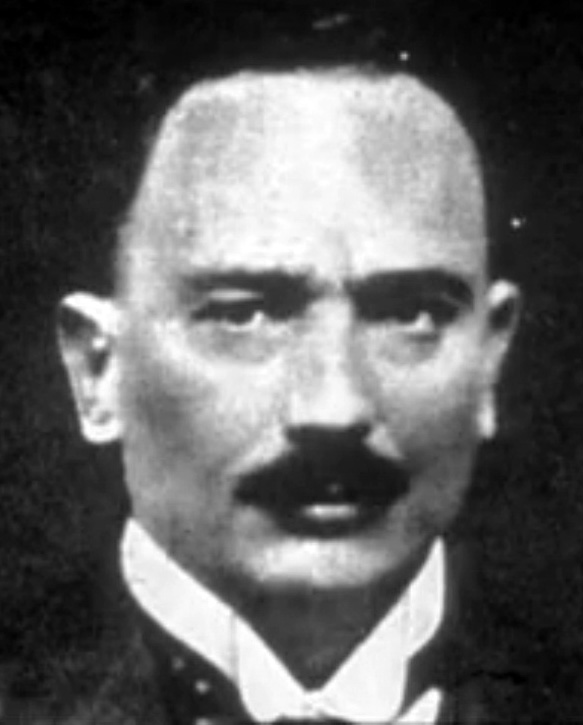
Ferdo Kovačević (date unknown)

Ferdo Kovačević (8 April 1870, Zagreb - 1 September 1927, Zagreb) was a Croatian painter and art professor.

== Biography ==
His father was the inventor and telegraphy pioneer, Ferdinand Kovačević.

In 1888, he graduated from the technical school in Zagreb. Thanks to a grant, he was able to study at the Vienna School of Arts and Crafts until 1893. After that, he trained in Italy. From 1902, he was a drawing teacher at the Forestry Academy then, after 1905, at the Arts and Crafts School. He received the title of Professor there in 1909.

He also taught geometry, perspective and decorative painting at the Academy of Fine Arts, University of Zagreb; becoming a professor there in 1917 and an Academician in 1919. From 1925 to 1926, he served as Vice-Rector.

He was a co-founder of the Society of Croatian Artists. For many years, he exhibited in Prague, Belgrade and Sofia as well as at the Salon in Paris.

Most of work involved landscapes. In his early period, he was influenced by Symbolism; painting dark forests and cemeteries. Later, he came under the influence of Impressionism; painting river scenes and landscapes with snow. He participated in designing decorations for the National and University Library when it was moved to a new building in 1913 and he was among the artists who provided murals and icons for Križevci Cathedral.

His painting, "The Tempest", was used on a Croatian postage stamp in 2017.

== Works ==
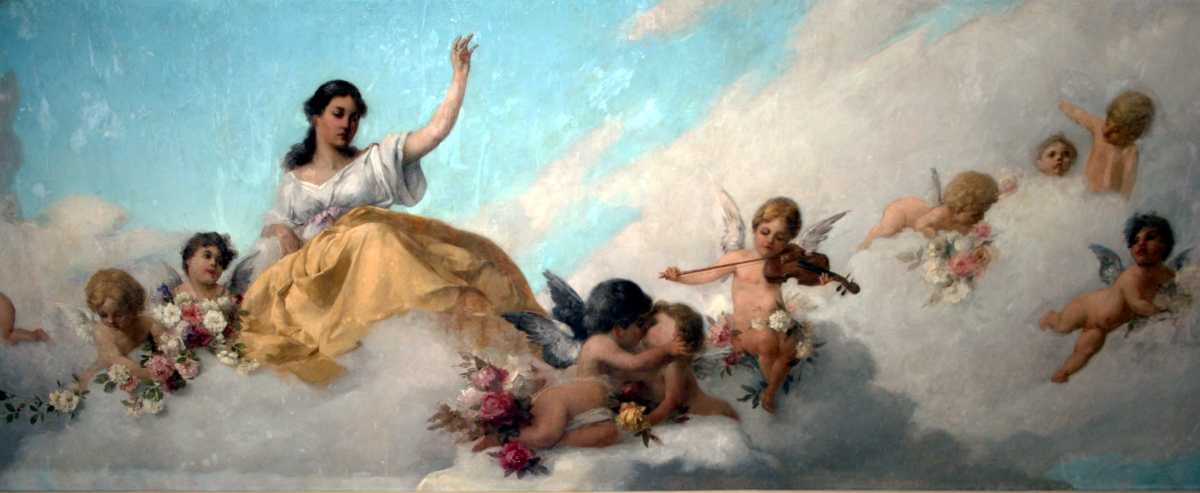
Allegory

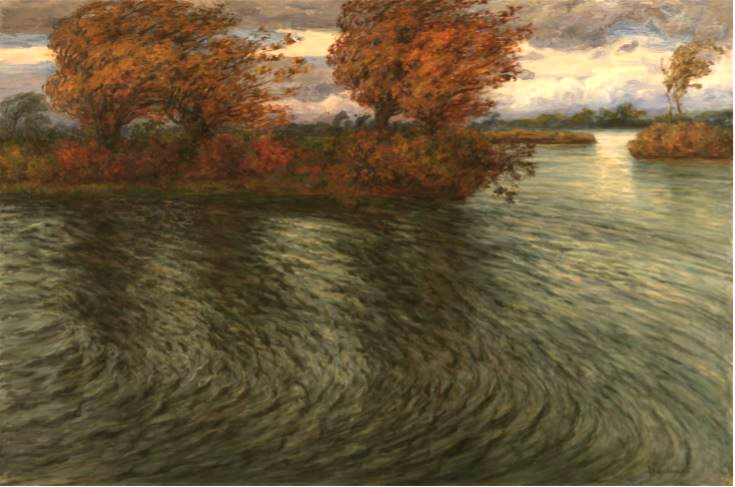
The Tempest

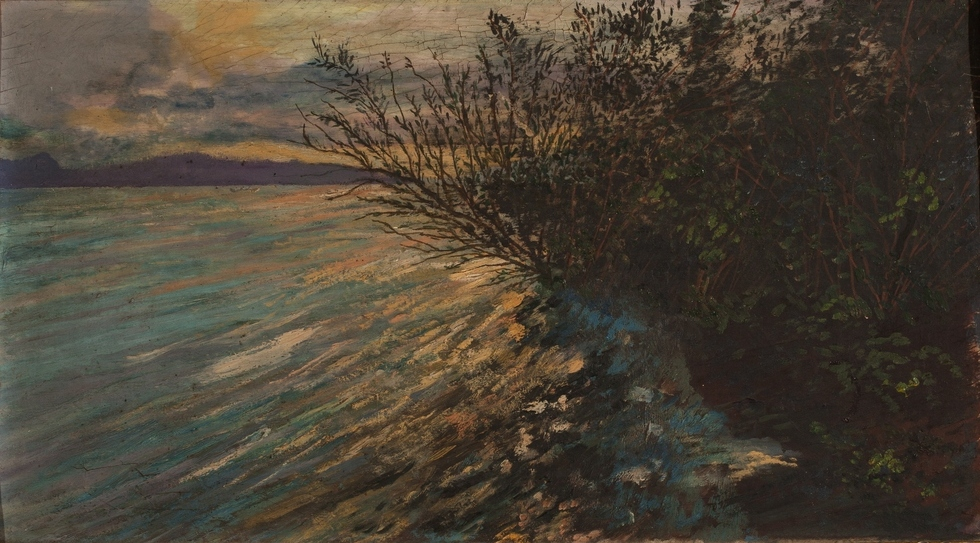
Evening

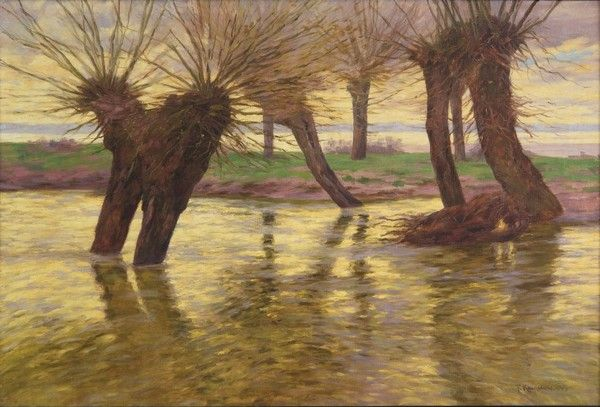
Landscape

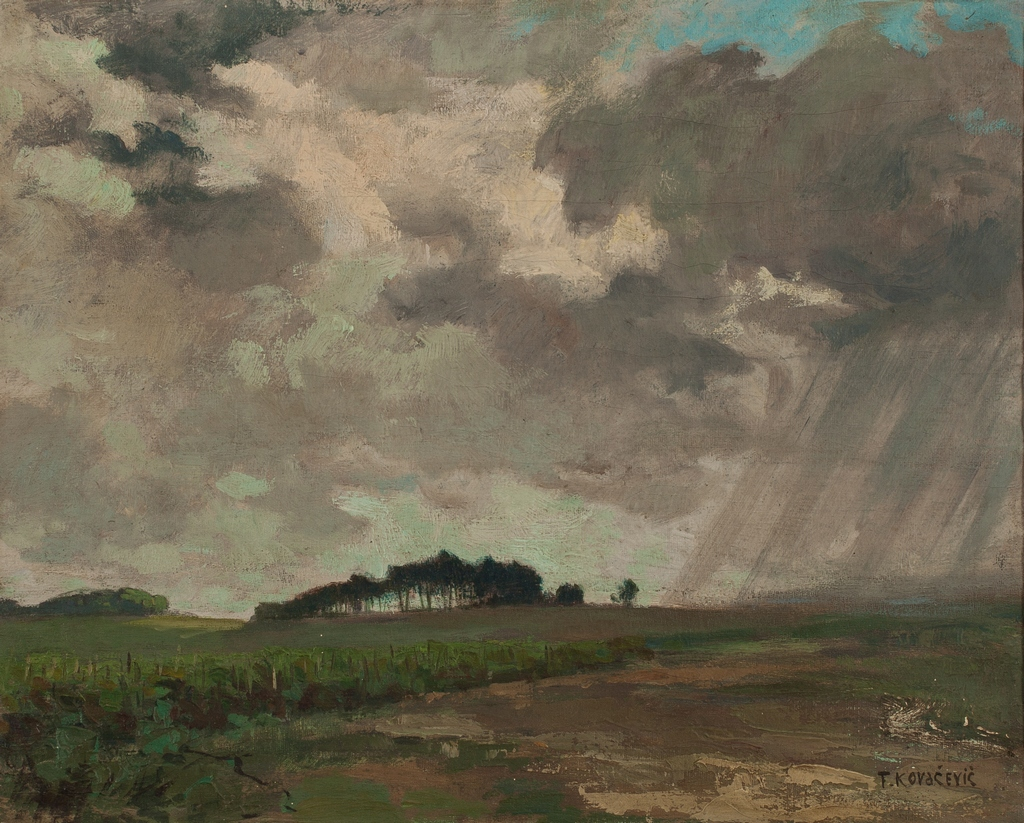
Rainy

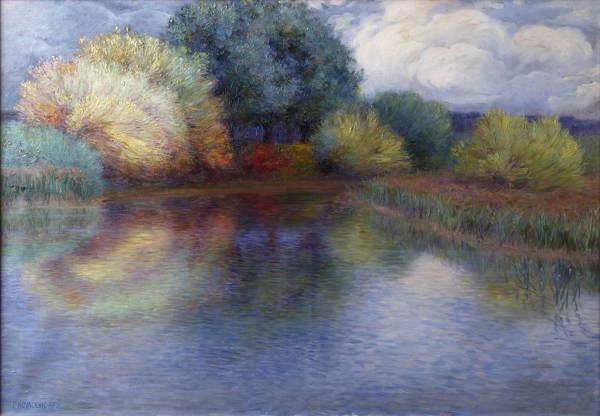
Willows on the Sava River

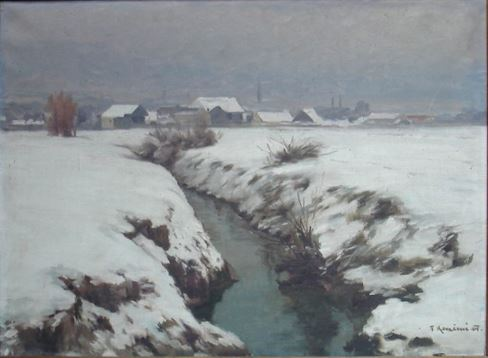
Snowy Landscape

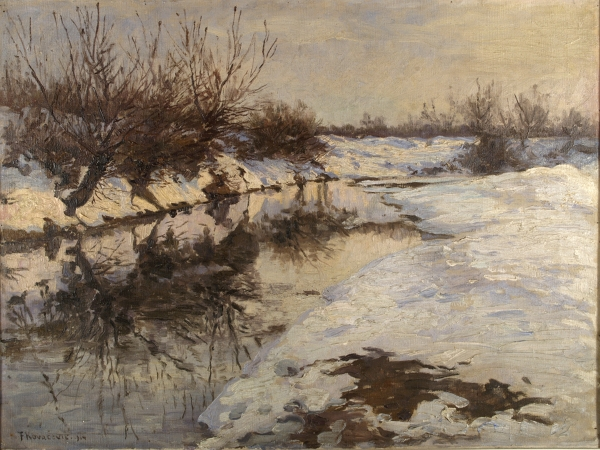
Winter Sun

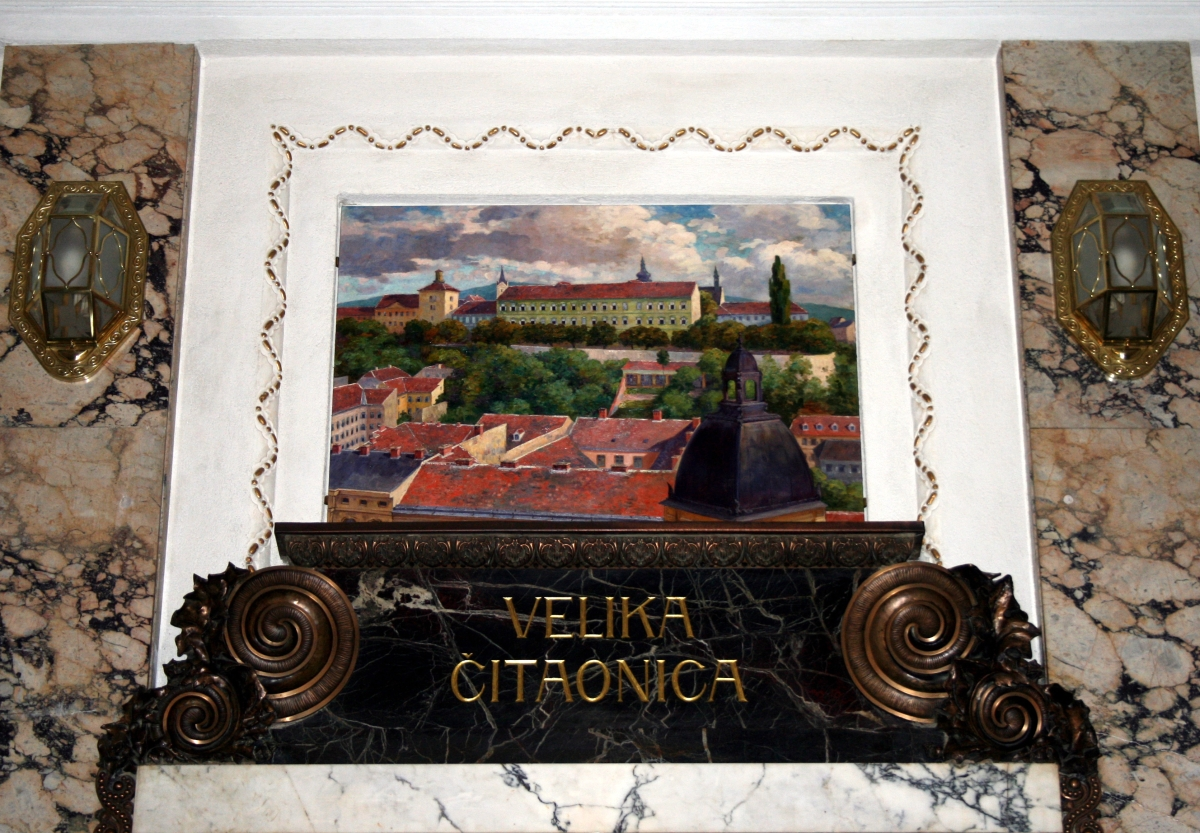
Painting of Zagreb

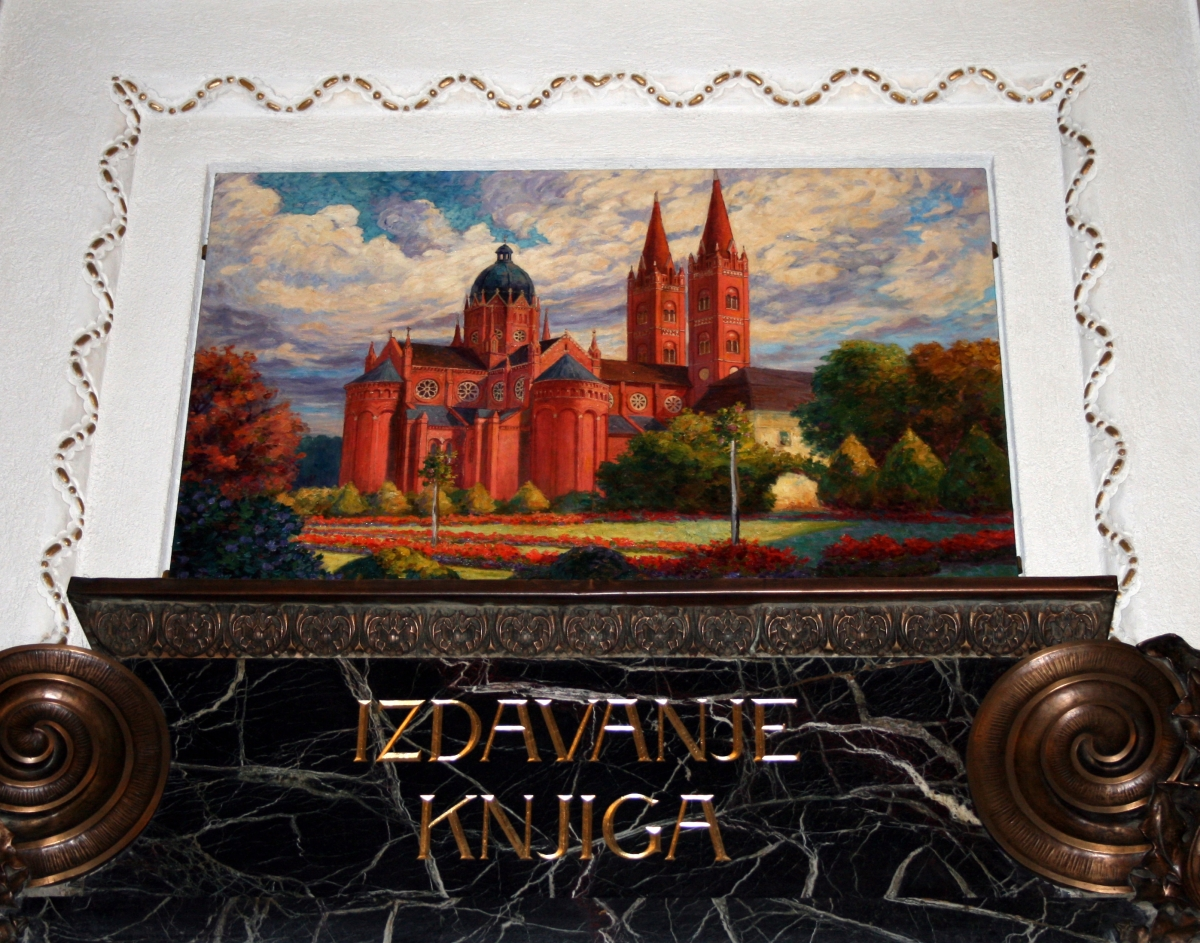
An oil painting of Đakovo

== Sources ==
- Biographical notes @ the Hrvatska Enciklopedija
- Life and works @ the Galerija Remek-djela
