= List of forestry journals =

This list includes notable peer-reviewed scientific journals in forestry, forest science, and related fields. More than 180 forestry journals were being published in 2008.

== List of journals ==
Journal	Homepage	Publisher	Publication History	Language	Publication Frequency
Acta Amazonica	journal home	National Institute of Amazonian Research	1971–present	English	4 issues per year
Allgemeine Forst- und Jagdzeitung	journal home	J.D. Sauerlaender's Verlag	1825–present	German	6 issues per year
Annals of Forest Science	journal home	Springer and French National Institute for Agriculture, Food and Environment	1923–present	English (French before 1999)	4 issues per year
Annals of Silvicultural Research	journal home	Council for Agricultural Research and Economics (CREA), Research Centre for Forestry and Wood	1932–present	English (Italian before 2010)	2/3 issues per year
Árvore	journal home	Sociedade de Investigações Florestais	1977–present	English	6 issues per year
Australian Forestry	journal home	Taylor & Francis and Institute of Foresters of Australia	1936–present	English	4 issues per year
Baltic Forestry	journal home	Lithuanian Research Centre for Agriculture and Forestry, Vytautas Magnus University & Latvian State Forest Research Institute	1995–present	English	2 issues per year
Bosque	journal home	Facultad de Ciencias Forestales - Austral University of Chile	1975–present	Spanish and English	3 issues per year
Canadian Journal of Forest Research	journal home	Canadian Science Publishing	1971–present	English	12 issues per year
Ciência Florestal	journal home	Federal University of Santa Maria	1991–present	Portuguese, English and Spanish	4 issues per year
Croatian Journal of Forest Engineering	journal home	Faculty of Forestry - University of Zagreb	2005–present	English	2 issues per year
Dendrobiology	journal home	Institute of Dendrology	1955–present	English (current) and Polish (former)	2 volumes per year
European Journal of Forest Research	journal home	Springer	1857–present	English	6 issues per year
Floresta e Ambiente	journal home	Instituto de Florestas - Federal Rural University of Rio de Janeiro	1994–present	English	4 issues per year
Forest Ecology and Management	journal home	Elsevier	1976–present	English	Continuous, Online
Forest Ecosystems	journal home	Springer and Beijing Forestry University	2014–present	English	Continuous, Online
Forest Policy and Economics	journal home	Elsevier	2000–present	English	Continuous, Online
Forest Science	journal home	Oxford University Press and Society of American Foresters	1955–present	English	6 issues per year
Forest Science and Technology	journal home	Taylor & Francis and Korean Society of Forest Science	2005–present	English	4 issues per year
Forestry Ideas	home	University of Forestry, Sofia, Bulgaria	2010–present	English	2 issues per year
Forests	journal home	MDPI	2010–present	English	12 issues per year
Forest Systems	journal home	Instituto Nacional de Investigación y Tecnología Agraria y Alimentaria (INIA-CSIC)	2010–present (Formerly "Investigación Agraria: Sistemas y Recursos Forestales" (1991-2009)	English	3 issues per year
Forestry	journal home	Oxford University Press and Institute of Chartered Foresters	1927–present	English	5 issues per year
iForest	journal home	Italian Society of Silviculture and Forest Ecology	2008–present	English	6 issues per year
The Indian Forester	journal home	Indian Council of Forestry Research and Education	1875–present	English	12 issues per year
International Journal of Forest Engineering	journal home	Taylor & Francis and Forest Products Society	1989–present	English	3 issues per year
Indian Journal of Forestry	journal home	Bishen Singh Mahendra Pal Singh	1978–present	English	4 issues per year
Irish Forestry	journal home	Society of Irish Foresters	1943–present	English	1 volume per year
Journal of Forest and Environmental Science	journal home	Institute of Forest Science - Kangwon National University	1980–present	English (some first issues in Korean)	4 issues per year
Journal of Forest Research	journal home	Taylor & Francis and Japanese Forest Society	1996–present	English	6 issues per year
Journal of Forest Planning	journal home	Japan Society of Forest Planning	1995–present	English	1 volume per year
Journal of Forestry	journal home	Oxford University Press and Society of American Foresters	1902–present	English	6 issues per year
Journal of Korean Society of Forest Science	journal home	Korean Society of Forest Science	1961–present	Korean	4 issues per year
Journal of Non-Timber Forest Products	journal home	Bishen Singh Mahendra Pal Singh	1994–present	English	4 issues per year
Journal of Sustainable Forestry	journal home	Taylor & Francis	1993–present	English	8 issues per year
Journal of Tropical Forest Science	journal home	Forest Research Institute Malaysia	1988–present	English	4 issues per year
Montes	journal home	Colegio Oficial de Ingenieros de Montes	1868–present	Spanish	4 issues per year
New Forests	journal home	Springer	1986–present	English	4 issues per year
New Zealand Journal of Forestry Science	journal home	Scion	1971–present	English	Continuous, Online
Pesquisa Florestal Brasileira	journal home	Embrapa Florestas	1980–present	Portuguese and English	Continuous, Online
Quebracho	journal home	Facultad de Ciencias Forestales - National University of Santiago del Estero	1993–present	Spanish, English and Portuguese	1 volume per year
Revista Chapingo. Serie Ciencias Forestales y del Ambiente	journal home	Chapingo Autonomous University	1995–present	Spanish	2-3 issues per year
Revista Mexicana de Ciencias Forestales	journal home	Instituto Nacional de Investigaciones Forestales, Agrícolas y Pecuarias	2010–present	Spanish	6 issues per year
Revista Forestal del Perú	journal home	La Molina National Agrarian University	1967–present	Spanish	2 issues per year
Revista Forestal Venezolana	journal home	Facultad de Ciencias Forestales y Ambientales - University of the Andes	1958–present	Spanish	2 issues per year
Revista pădurilor	journal home	Societatea Progresul Silvic	1882–present	Romanian and English	3-6 issues per year
Revue Forestière Française	journal home	AgroParisTech	1801–present	French	6 issues per year
Scandinavian Journal of Forest Research	journal home	Taylor & Francis and Nordic Forest Research	1986–present	English	8 issues per year
Schweizerische Zeitschrift für Forstwesen	journal home	Swiss Forest Society	1850–present	German and French; occasionally English and Italian	6 issues per year
Scottish Forestry	journal home	Royal Scottish Forestry Society	1858–present	English	3 issues per year
Siberian Journal of Forest Science	journal home	Siberian Branch of the Russian Academy of Sciences	2014–present	English	6 issues per year
Silva Fennica	journal home	Finnish Society of Forest Science	1926–present	English, German, and Finnish	Continuous, Online
Small-scale Forestry	journal home	Springer and International Union of Forest Research Organizations	2002–present	English	4 issues per year
Southern Forests	journal home	Taylor & Francis, NISC and Southern African Institute of Forestry	1938–present	English	4 issues per year
Šumarski list	journal home	Croatian Forestry Society	1876–present	Croatian	12 issues per year
Sylwan	journal home	Polish Forest Society	1820–present	Polish	12 issues per year

== See also ==
- Forestry literature
- List of botany journals
- List of environmental journals
- List of environmental social science journals
- List of forestry universities and colleges
- List of historic journals of forestry
- List of scientific journals
