= Andrei Șaguna National College =

Andrei Șaguna National College (Romanian: Colegiul Naţional "Andrei Șaguna") may refer to one of two educational institutions in Romania:

- Andrei Șaguna National College (Brașov)
- Andrei Șaguna National College (Sibiu)
