= Ribbentrop (surname) =

Ribbentrop or von Ribbentrop is a German surname. Notable people with the surname include:

- Joachim von Ribbentrop (1893–1946), Foreign Minister of Nazi Germany from 1938 until 1945, executed for war crimes
- Rudolf von Ribbentrop (1921–2019), German Waffen-SS officer and son of Joachim von Ribbentrop
- Berthold Ribbentrop, pioneering German forester
