= Bosque (journal) =

- Discipline: Forestry
- Language: English
- Edited by: Corti, P., Diaz, I., Rolleri, A.

Publication details
- History: 1975–present
- Publisher: Austral University of Chile (Chile)
- Frequency: Triannual
- Impact factor: 0.500 (2018)

Standard abbreviations
- ISO 4: Bosque

Indexing
- ISSN: 0304-8799 (print); 0717-9200 (web)
- OCLC no.: 499830644

Links
- Journal homepage; Online archive

BOSQUE is an open access journal that publishes original research related to forest ecology and management, production of forest resources, wood science and technology, silviculture, conservation of biodiversity, and rural development associated with forest ecosystems. BOSQUE is published by the Forestry Faculty of the Austral University of Chile.The published manuscripts include peer-reviewed Articles, Reviews, and Short Communications. BOSQUE's first issue was published in 1975 and the journal was issued yearly until 1985. From 1985 to 2003 it was issued twice a year and from 2003 on three times a year. BOSQUE was included in the Science Citation Index Expanded in 2009.

== See also ==
- List of forestry journals
