= Victor Giurgiu =

Romanian forestry engineer (1930–2021)

Victor Giurgiu (16 May 1930 – 23 August 2021) was a Romanian forestry engineer and a titular member of the Romanian Academy from 2009.

Born in Moieciu, Brașov County in 1930, he studied at the Andrei Șaguna High School in Brașov. He graduated from college in 1953 and he obtained his PhD in 1957 from the Institute of Silviculture in Brașov, and then worked at the Institute from 1960 to 1995. In 1991 he became a professor at the Faculty of Silviculture of the University of Suceava.

Giurgiu was elected corresponding member of the Romanian Academy on December 18, 1991, and became a full member on January 14, 2009. He was the recipient of the Traian Săvulescu Prize of the Romanian Academy, of the Scientific Merit Award, and of the Order of the Star of Romania. He died in 2021, at the age of 91.

== Works ==
- Victor Giurgiu (Sep 2011). "Simpozionul "Biodiversitatea pădurilor din România", dedicat "Zilei Internaționale a Biodiversității"". Revista pădurilor (in Romanian). 126 (3–4): 104–106. ISSN 1583-7890. 16753. Archived from the original on May 22, 2014.
- Victor Giurgiu (Nov 2011). "Revista pădurilor (Journal of forests) 125 years of existence". Revista pădurilor. 126 (6): 3–7. ISSN 1583-7890. Archived from the original on 2016-05-17.
