= Schweizerische Zeitschrift für Forstwesen =

- Language: German, French, English
- Edited by: Barbara Allgaier Leuch

Publication details
- History: 1850-present
- Publisher: Swiss Forestry Society (Switzerland)
- Frequency: Monthly

Standard abbreviations
- ISO 4: Schweiz. Z. Forstwes.

Indexing
- ISSN: 0036-7818 (print); 2235-1469 (web)

Links
- Journal homepage

Schweizerische Zeitschrift für Forstwesen (the Swiss Forestry Journal) is one of the oldest forestry journals still in print in the world. It was established in 1850.

== See also ==
- List of forestry journals
