= Montes (journal) =

Revista Montes (Journal of Forestry) is a Spanish scientific journal of forestry. One of the oldest, still-publishing journals of forestry in the world, it was established in 1868. Over the years there have been some changes of title and periods in which the journal did not appear. The word "Montes" in the journal's title is used to mean forestry, although the Spanish word can also refer to hills.

== History ==
From 1868 to 1875, the journal was published monthly as the Revista Forestal económica y agrícola. It did not appear in 1876 but was relaunched the following year as Montes. In 1945 it was renamed Montes: Publicación de los Ingenieros de Montes and in 1984 renamed Montes: Revista de Ambito Forestal. As of its 119th volume (2015), the journal's name is Revista Montes.

== See also ==
- List of forestry journals
