= Forest Ecology and Management =

Peer-reviewed scientific journal

- Discipline: Forestry
- Language: English
- Edited by: P. Attiwill, D. Binkley, T.S. Fredericksen, J-P. Laclau, H. Sterba

Publication details
- History: 1977–present
- Publisher: Elsevier
- Frequency: Semimonthly
- Impact factor: 4.384 (2021)

Standard abbreviations
- ISO 4: For. Ecol. Manag.

Indexing
- ISSN: 0378-1127

Links
- Journal homepage

Forest Ecology and Management is a semimonthly peer-reviewed scientific journal covering forest ecology and the management of forest resources. The journal publishes research manuscripts that report results of original research, review articles, and book reviews. Forestry-related topics are covered that apply biological and social knowledge to address problems encountered in forest management and conservation.

== See also ==
- List of forestry journals
