= Sylwan =

- Discipline: Forestry
- Language: Polish
- Edited by: Wojciech Grodzki

Publication details
- History: 1820-present
- Publisher: Polish Forest Society (Poland)
- Frequency: Monthly
- Impact factor: 0.691 (2018)

Standard abbreviations
- ISO 4: Sylwan

Indexing
- ISSN: 0039-7660
- LCCN: 59053413
- OCLC no.: 1607487

Links
- Journal homepage

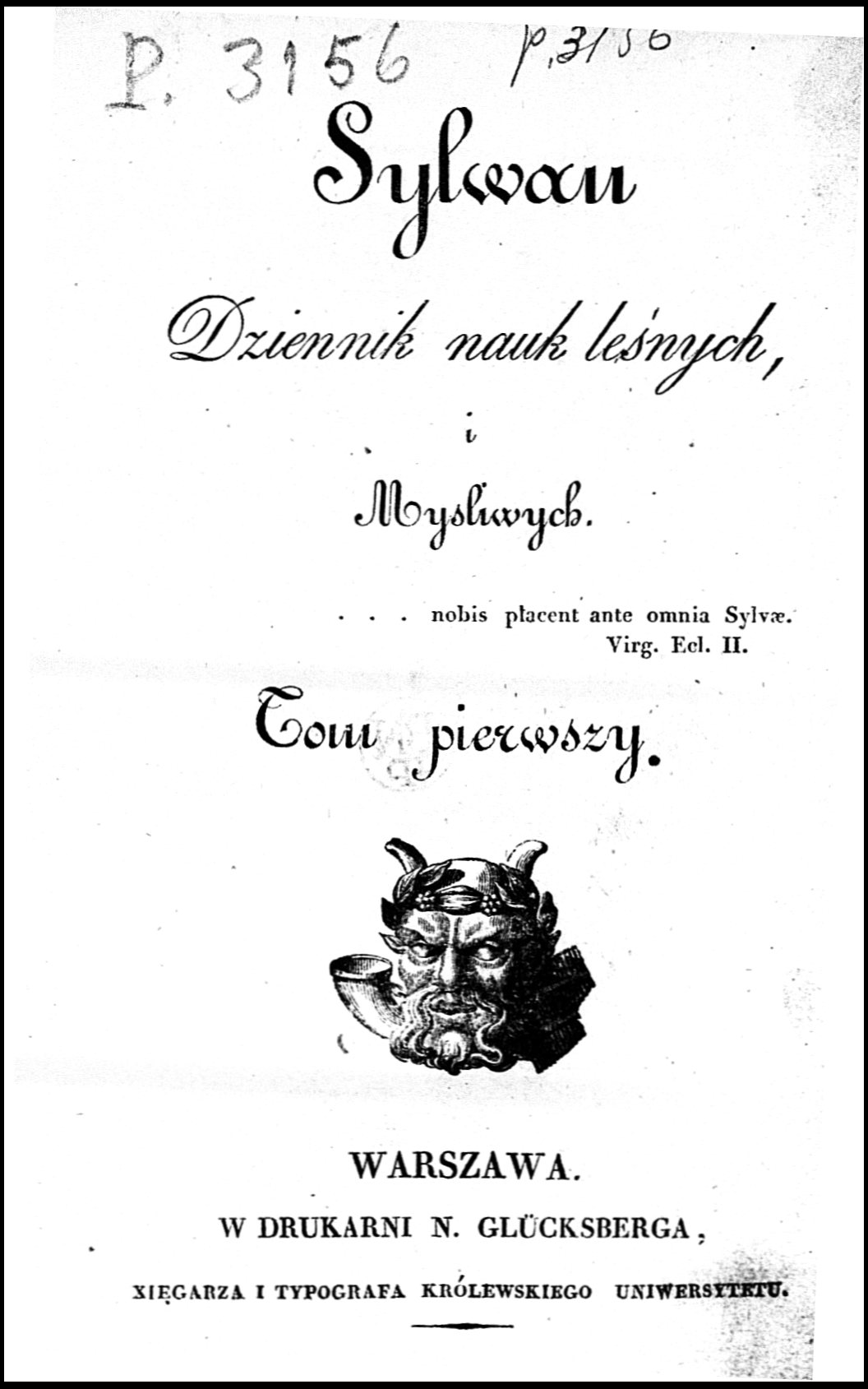

Sylwan is the oldest scientific journal covering forestry in the world that is still in print. It was established in 1820 as the semi-official organ of the Royal Forestry Corps in Poland. Since 1925 it has been published by the Polish Forest Society.

== Abstracting and indexing ==
Sylwan is abstracted and indexed in the Science Citation Index Expanded, CAB International, and Polish Scientific Journal Contents. According to the Journal Citation Reports, the journal has a 2018 impact factor of 0.691.

== See also ==
- List of forestry journals
