= Ivan Tišov =

Croatian painter

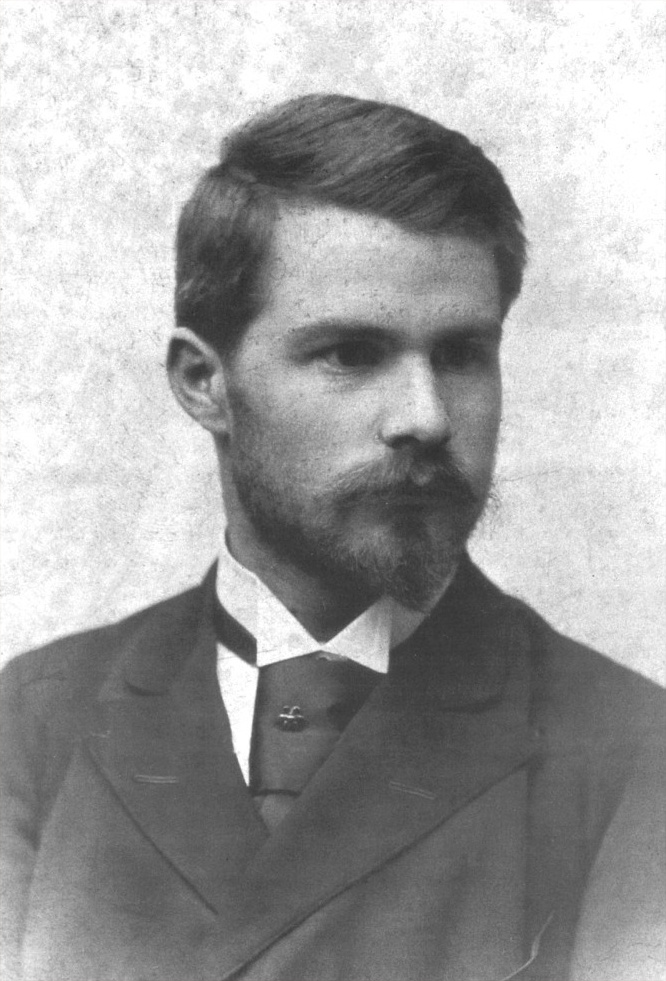
- Ivan Tišov
- Born: 8 February 1870; Viškovci near Đakovo, Austria-Hungary (today's Croatia)
- Died: 20 September 1928 (aged 58); Zagreb, Kingdom of Serbs, Croats and Slovenes (today's Croatia)
- Known for: Oil painting, graphic art
- Movement: secessionism

Ivan Tišov (8 February 1870 – 20 September 1928) was a Croatian painter. He studied art at the Academy of Fine Arts, Munich, bringing back ideas from the Munich Secession movement to Zagreb. He is best known for his work in public and government buildings in Zagreb, and paintings in churches in his native Slavonia in north-east Croatia.

== Biography ==
Ivan Tišov was born in the village of Viškovci near Đakovo.

He attended elementary school in the village, and continued his education at the School of Crafts in Zagreb. He attended the School of Applied Arts in Vienna, and received a scholarship to the Academy of Fine Arts, Munich. From 1895, he was a vocational teacher, and professor of painting and drawing at the Academy of Fine Arts, Zagreb where he worked for the rest of his life.

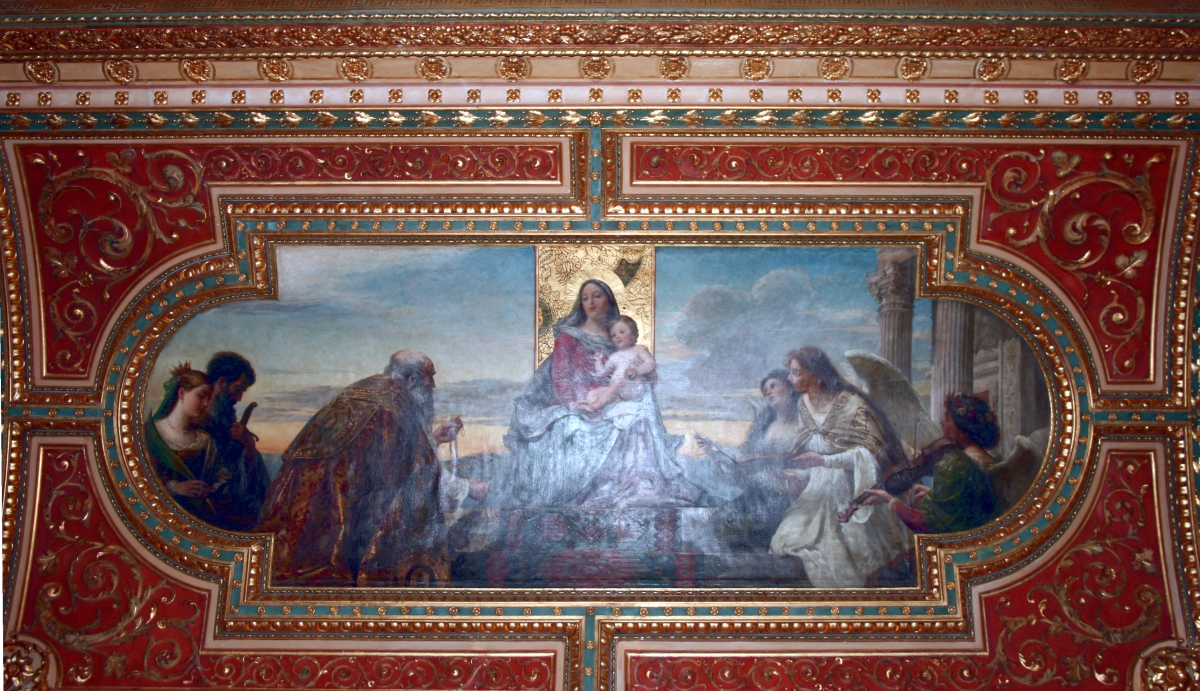
"Worship" (Bogoštovlje) by Ivan Tišov on the ceiling of the Croatian Institute of History in Zagreb

While he was still studying in Vienna, Tišov received a commission to paint four allegorical works on the ceiling of the Golden Hall in Zagreb, under the titles of worship, theology, art and science. With his picture of Art, also known as Music, Tišov won a bronze medal at the Millennium Exhibition in Budapest in 1896.

Tišov painted numerous portraits without preparatory drawings or studies. His subjects include his wife Ana Neuhäuser, Vladimir Vidrić, and Grga Martić.

By the end of the century, Tišov's painting showed the influence of Vlaho Bukovac. His pictures became darker with contrasting yellow, blue and green. Themes were taken from his native Slavonia, such as the painting "Under the Maple" (Pod javorom) which is one of his most beautiful works. In later years, folklore would replace mythology. In addition, Tišov worked on wall paintings in Križevci and Bjelovar, in St. Catherine and other churches.

He spent a year (1913–1914), training in Paris at the Académie Julian, to prepare for making decorations in the University Library in Zagreb.

He died in Zagreb on 20 September 1928.

== Legacy ==
Ivan Tišov's paintings of worship, theology, art and science decorate the ceilings in the Croatian Institute of History in Zagreb.

Although largely in the shadow of the other greats of Croatian art at the time (primarily Vlaho Bukovac, his work has an essentially timeless quality. He was a skilled colourist, and his work contains originality of composition, yet lacks the freedom of expression that marks other contemporary painters. However, as much of his painting was large government orders, and for the church - altar paintings in the Roman Catholic Church, the Orthodox Iconostasis of the Church of Saint Nicholas in Pačetin, the foyer ceiling of the Croatian National Theatre, and the "Golden Hall" building of the Department of Religion and Education of the Government of Zagreb - that should not be too surprising. His paintings mark the late classical period and its transition towards secession style in painting.

== Works ==
Tišov's works include:

- Worship (Bogoštovlje)
- Theology (Nastava)
- Art (Umjetnost), also sometimes known as Music
- Science (Znanost)
- Kiss (Poljubac), 1902
- Paris Court (Parisov sud), 1902
- Salome Dances (Ples Salome), 1902
- Piper from Posavina (Gajdaša iz Posavine), 1902
- Under the Maple (Pod javorom), 1906
- Portrait of Ana Neuhäuser
- Portrait of Vladimir Vidrić
- Portrait of Grga Martić
- Foyer ceiling of the National Theatre in Zagreb, 1905
- Kraljevac Stream (Potok Kraljevac), 1912
- Self-portrait (Autoportret), 1914
- Decorations for the University Library (now National Archives) in Zagreb, 1914
- Wealth of the World (Bogatstvo svijeta), 1916
- Stream in Winter (Potok zimi), 1922
- Creation, Last Judgement in the Greek Catholic Cathedral in Križevci
- Oil paintings and frescoes in a number of churches in Zagreb, Križevci Korenica, Bjelovar, Plaško, Stražeman

== Exhibitions ==
During his lifetime, Tišov exhibited in Zagreb, Vienna, and Budapest

- 2005 Retrospektivna izložba Ivana Tišova at the Gallery of Fine Arts in Osijek
- 1988 Retrospective Exhibit Ivan Tisov, Osijek

== Public institutions ==
Tišov's work can be found in the following public buildings

- Croatian Institute of History, Zagreb
- Croatian National Theatre, Zagreb
- Croatian State Archives, Zagreb
