= The Indian Forester =

- Discipline: Forestry
- Language: English
- Edited by: P. P. Bhojvaid

Publication details
- History: 1875-present
- Publisher: Indian Council of Forestry Research and Education (India)
- Frequency: Monthly

Standard abbreviations
- ISO 4: Indian For.

Indexing
- CODEN: IORA8
- ISSN: 0019-4816
- LCCN: sa66006360
- OCLC no.: 566133560

Links
- Journal homepage; Online access

The Indian Forester is a peer-reviewed scientific journal covering research in forestry. It is one of the oldest forestry journals still in existence in the world. It was established in 1875 and is published by the Indian Council of Forestry Research and Education.

== History ==
The Indian Forester was established in the forestry conference held at Allahabad in January 1874. The journal was founded by Sir Dietrich Brandis, with William Schlich as the first honorary editor.

== See also ==
- List of forestry journals
