= Italian Society of Silviculture and Forest Ecology =

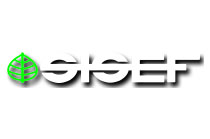

The Italian Society of Silviculture and Forest Ecology (Italian: Società Italiana di Selvicoltura ed Ecologia Forestale, or SISEF), established in 1995, is a non-profit cultural association promoting the diffusion of scientific forest culture in Italy, and all over the world.

== Mission ==
The mission of SISEF is to promote researches on:

- structure, functionality and sustainable management of forest ecosystems
- forest habitat, forest biodiversity and genetics
- dendro-ecology, silviculture, wood production and technology, forest harvesting
- landscape, forest ecosystem services

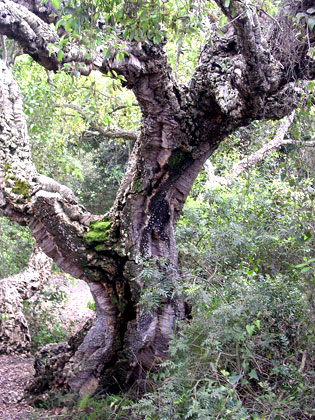

SISEF aims also to promote

- Coordination, strengthening and networking of forest research
- Forest education

SISEF supports communication among its members interested in studying forest science and forestry issues, covering all aspects of an interdisciplinary science, including biology, ecology, silviculture, wood production, climate change, environmental and socio-economy aspects.

SISEF is accredited by ANVUR, the Italian National Agency for the evaluation of Universities and Research Institutes; and is a member of AISSA, the Italian Association of Scientific Agriculture Societies.

SISEF's headquarters is in Viterbo, Italy, at the Department for Innovation in Biological, Agro-Food and Forest Systems, of Tuscia University.

== Members ==
All the Italian and foreign researchers interested in the activities carried out by the Society can be members of SISEF. The SISEF members elect every two years five members of the Board, one Secretary and one President. Three auditor board members are also elected for supervising the SISEF budgeting. An annual fee is due by the SISEF members. Currently, SISEF has about 260 members.

== Board ==
Years	President	Secretary	Members of Board	Auditor Board
2012-2015	Marco Marchetti	Giovanni Sanesi	Elena Paoletti, Gabriele Bucci, Giustino Tonon, Marco Fioravanti, Silvano Fares	Marco Borghetti, Davide Travaglini, Federico Maetzke

== Past presidents ==
Years	
2011-2015	Piermaria Corona
2007-2011	Giuseppe Scarascia Mugnozza
2003-2007	Marco Borghetti
1999-2003	Giuseppe Scarascia Mugnozza
1995-1999	Franco Viola

== Research groups ==
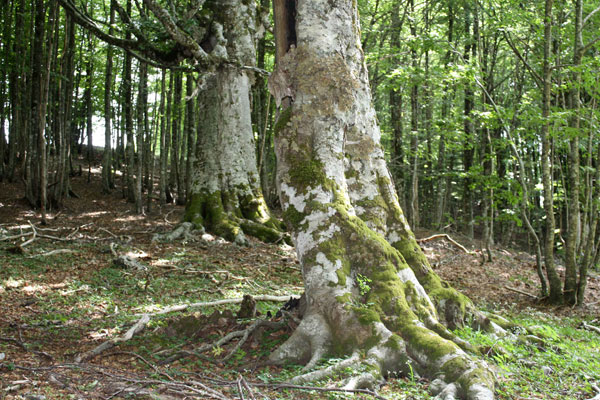

SISEF coordinates research groups related to specific forest issues

Name of research group	Coordinator	Active since
Pollution and forests	Silvano Fares	1998
Terpenes in ecology	Marco Michelozzi	1998
Forest Biodiversity	Silvia Fineschi	1998
Wood production	Gianfranco Minotta	1998
Forest Modelling		2008
Forests and Climate Change	Paolo De Angelis	2000
Silviculture	Andrea Cutini	2000
History and archeology of forest Landscape	Mauro Agnoletti	2014
Soil Ecology	Andrea Squartini	2006
Forest management	Paolo Cantiani e Fabrizio Ferretti	2007
Forest geomatics	Gherardo Chirici	2012
Communication	Giorgio Vacchiano	2017
Agroforestry	Pierluigi Paris	2013
Wood technology and forest harvesting	Roberto Zanuttini	2014
Management of Forest Fire	Davide Ascoli, Michele Salis, Luca Tonarelli	2016
Urban greening	Fabio Salbitano	2017

== Congresses ==
SISEF organizes a National Congress every two years, in order to create an opportunity for interaction and exchange between researchers and stakeholders.

- 11° SISEF National Congress - "La foresta che cambia. Ricerca, qualità della vita e opportunità in un paese che cambia" - Rome 10–13 October 2017
- 10° SISEF National Congress - "Sostenere il Pianeta, Boschi per la vita" - Florence, 15–18 September 2015
- 9º SISEF National Congress – “Multifunzionalità degli ecosistemi forestali montani: sfide e opportunità per la ricerca e lo sviluppo” - Bolzano, 16–19 September 2013
- 8º SISEF National Congress – “Selvicoltura e conservazione del suolo: la sfida Europea per una gestione territoriale integrata” - Rende (CS), 04-7 October 2011
- 7º SISEF National Congress – “Sviluppo e adattamento, naturalità e conservazione: opportunità per un sistema forestale in transizione” - Pesche (IS), 29 Set – 3 October 2009
- 6º SISEF National Congress – “La Gestione delle Foreste tra Cambiamenti Globali e Azioni Locali” -Arezzo, 25–27 September 2007
- 5º SISEF National Congress – “Foreste e Società: Cambiamenti, Conflitti, Sinergie” - Grugliasco (TO), 27–29 September 2005
- 4º SISEF National Congress – “Meridiani foreste” - Rifreddo (PZ), 07-10 October 2003
- 3º SISEF National Congress - “Alberi e Foreste per il Nuovo Millennio” - Viterbo, 15–18 October 2001
- 2º SISEF National Congress – “Applicazioni e Prospettive per la Ricerca Forestale Italiana”- Bologna, 20–22 October 1999
- 1º SISEF National Congress – “La Ricerca Italiana per le Foreste e la Selvicoltura” - Legnaro (PD), 04-6 June 1997

== Journals ==
SISEF publishes two scholarly journals:

i Forest is an Open Access, peer-reviewed online journal. The journal encompasses a broad range of research aspects concerning forest science: forest ecology, biodiversity/genetics and ecophysiology, silviculture, forest inventory and planning, forest protection and monitoring, forest harvesting, landscape ecology, forest history, wood technology. iForest is freely and universally accessible online. It has been selected for coverage by Thomson Reuters Web of Science (Impact Factor 2013 JCR: 1.150) and SCOPUS.

Forest@ is an Open Access, peer-reviewed online journal published in Italian. It aims at disseminating scientific articles, short communications, technical reports, review papers about forest and environmental sciences.
