= History of environmentalism in Germany =

The History of environmentalism in Germany covers movements and political parties supporting conservation and environmental activities in Germany and its predecessor states. Environmentalism in Germany has evolved since the late nineteenth century. Early efforts at nature protection and urban sanitation, the Nazi experience, and civic mobilization in the postwar years have all contributed to the development of German environmental history. In recent decades, the focus has shifted to 'history from below', with water, floodplains, forests, and fish playing active roles in political, economic, and social transformation

== Before 1945 ==
=== Beauty and sanitation ===
The German states unified in 1870 and rapidly industrialized. Pollution in the air and the marketplace was troubling in the fast-growing cities. Heavy industry based on soft coal also led to concerns about altered and polluted rural landscapes. Early efforts focused on preserving natural beauty and protecting specific "natural monuments" as well as urban sanitation. Groups like the German League for Bird Protection (1875) and various local and regional conservation societies emerged, focusing on specific aspects of nature. Some early conservation efforts were intertwined with nationalist sentiments and a "back to nature" romanticism, sometimes with problematic völkisch (folkish) ideologies.

The leading reformer was Max Joseph von Pettenkofer (1818–1901), a distinguished Bavarian chemist and hygienist, ennobled in 1883. He gained recognition for his pioneering work in practical hygiene, advocating for clean water, fresh air, and proper sewage disposal. He was a strong advocate for creating hygiene institutes across Germany. His groundbreaking work served as a model, influencing the establishment of similar institutes worldwide. He is particularly renowned for establishing hygiene as an experimental science, which, together with the research of Robert Koch and Rudolf Virchow, gave the laboratory-oriented German universities world leadership in biology.

The Weimar Constitution of 1919-1933 included a mandate for the state to protect historical and natural monuments and the countryside (Article 150), indicating a growing awareness of these issues.

=== Rhine River and Ruhr region ===
The Rhine River was a complex and ever-changing entity. It played a pivotal role in Germany's industrialization during the 19th and 20th centuries by providing essential water for chemical factories and serving as a shipping route for raw materials and finished goods, while also carrying away pollutants. Simultaneously, the upper Rhine's picturesque landscapes, adorned with Gothic architecture, became a symbol of European Romanticism. This attracted travelers seeking refuge from the perceived harshness of modern industrial life. The competing perceptions of the Rhine's "usefulness" and "beauty" have been significant drivers of its transformation over the last two centuries.

=== Nazi Era ===
The (1933-1945) is highly controversial since the Nazi regime enacted some pioneering environmental legislation, including nature conservation laws that still exist in some form. However, their motivations were deeply rooted in their "Blood and soil" ideology and racial purity. Nature conservation was often twisted for propaganda purposes to fit the Nazi worldview, emphasizing a connection to the "German soil" while simultaneously implementing destructive policies. The association of some early environmental ideas with Nazi ideology made it difficult for the environmental movement to develop in Germany for some time after the war.

== Recent ==
According to Professor Mark Cioc, Germany's post-WWII environmental trajectory diverged significantly between its two halves before reunification. West Germany's rapid economic recovery in the 1950s came at a steep environmental cost, particularly severe industrial pollution in the Ruhr Valley. This environmental degradation became a political catalyst when the ruling Christian Democrats failed to respond adequately, enabling the Social Democrats (SPD) to capitalize on public concern through their "Blue Skies over the Ruhr" initiative, ultimately helping Willy Brandt ascend to leadership. Environmental activism gained further momentum with the Green Party's formation, driven by nuclear safety fears and pollution concerns. After entering the parliament in 1983, the Greens eventually joined an SPD coalition and successfully negotiated Germany's commitment to eliminate nuclear power by 2021. West Germany simultaneously developed robust environmental legislation, including the 1957 Federal Wastewater Act and 1974 Federal Air Pollution Act, while actively engaging in international environmental cooperation.

East Germany experienced far more severe environmental destruction under Soviet-influenced industrial policies, with comprehensive contamination of land, air, and water resources. The Communist system's suppression of public environmental debate compounded these problems. The pollution became emblematic through symbols like the heavily polluting Trabant automobile and the severely contaminated industrial center of Bitterfeld. German reunification in 1990 brought dramatic environmental improvements to the former East as dirty industries closed and the much ridiculed Trabant automobiles disappeared from roads. The heavily militarized border zone had inadvertently become a wildlife sanctuary, but now faced development pressures. By the late 1990s, unified Germany still confronted substantial environmental challenges. The economy's continued dependence on fossil fuels generated significant carbon dioxide, sulfur, and ozone emissions. Air quality issues persisted in the Ruhr and smaller industrial regions. Water contamination remained problematic along major industrial waterways including the Rhine and Elbe rivers.

=== Postwar ===
After World War II, when Germany was controlled by the victories Allies, the primary focus was on economic reconstruction after the enormous damage to industrial areas and the railway system; environmental concerns were low priority. Industrial recovery in both capitalist West Germany and Communist East Germany, led to significant environmental degradation, especially air and water pollution. While policy was slow to catch up, some scientists and, later, the public began to voice concerns about pollution and its health impacts. The precautionary principle ("Vorsorgeprinzip") began to take root in German thinking, advocating for preventative action even without complete scientific certainty.

The German way of thinking about the environment was transformed from traditionalistic "Heimat" to modern "Umwelt". "Heimat" goes back centuries and evokes emotional, cultural, and national identity tied to a specific landscape or region. In the 19th and early 20th centuries, it was often linked to romanticized notions of nature and even nationalist ideologies. In 1946 to 1965 there were numerous films--the Heimatfilm-- in which filmmakers placed a profound emphasis on nature and the provincial homeliness of Germany. Forests, mountains, landscapes, and rural areas portrayed Germany in a homely light with which the German people readily identified. "Umwelt" is a more modern, scientific ecological approach that emphasizes the environment as a system of interactions between humans and nature, grounded in science and global awareness.

=== GDR: Communist East Germany ===
East Germany (GDR) presented itself as environmentally conscious due to its socialist ideology, but in practice, economic growth was typically prioritized over environmental protection, leading to severe pollution. Acid rain devastated forests and lakes, while buildings were corroding and blackening due to high-sulfur coal emissions. Antiquated chemical factories dumped heavy metals and toxic substances into the rivers and groundwater. The Communist Party controlled all the media, which ignored the matter. Nevertheless grassroots environmental groups began to form in the late 1970s, proclaiming their loyalty to Marxism but usually meeting under the protective umbrella of the Protestant Church.

=== Air pollution ===
In terms of the historical roots of Germany's air pollution policies, "modern" environmental policies first began to be developed in the 1960s, with the United States, Japan, Sweden, and to some extent Great Britain at the forefront in establishing new environmental institutions, procedures, instruments, standards, and technologies. Learning from these countries, Germany quickly caught up, especially in the area of air pollution control policy.

The largest triggers for change were:

1. The widespread damages to health (smog) and nature (acid rain) caused by air pollution.
2. The shock of the two oil price crises (1973 and 1979) that highlighted the problem of the German economy's strong dependence on unsure foreign sources.
3. The growing opposition to the country's growing reliance on nuclear power.

=== The German green party ===
The German green party: Alliance 90/The Greens (Bündnis 90/Die Grünen) was founded in 1993 after the West German green party (Die Grünen, formed in 1980) and the East German green party (Bündnis 90, formed in 1990) joined after the reunification of Germany.

in 1998, Alliance 90/The Greens joined a coalition government with the SPD, forming a Red-Green alliance that would last until 2005. In order to agree to the coalition, Alliance 90/The Greens had 3 priorities: to reduce unemployment, close nuclear-power stations/Germany to not rely on nuclear power, and for citizenship laws to be reformed. The coalition remained in place following the 2002 election. However, green policies were no longer considered to be a focal point so much, with unemployment growing and other economic issues being more pressing, leading to the rise of the CDU/CSU, and the eventual loss of a majority in parliament.

Germany is widely admired across Europe for its strict environmental laws, advanced green technologies, the phase-out of nuclear power, and a strong Green Party. International organizations like the OECD and UN have called Germany a “laboratory for green growth” and a “beacon” for renewable energy policy. Scholars agree that environmentalism is deeply embedded in German national identity. Political parties across the spectrum claim green credentials, and environmental issues are often seen as commonsense, not divisive.

=== Renewable energy through wind power ===
Britain has the best potential wind resources in Europe; Germany has far less. Nevertheless in the late 20th century Germany built the largest wind power capacity worldwide. Volkmar Lauber explains this in terms of seven advantages inside Germany:

- A stronger national commitment to renewable energy;
- Superior national governance emphasizing effectiveness;
- Deployment of innovations efficiency and cheaply;
- Administrative efficiency and simplicity;
- Rapid buildup of a domestic equipment industry;
- Emergence of new entrepreneurs more committed to renewable energy than the old established electric companies;
- Outpouring of acceptance and support throughout German society and politics.

== See also ==
- Alliance 90/The Greens
- Anti-nuclear movement in Germany
- East German Green Party
- Air pollution in Germany
- Water supply and sanitation in Germany
