= Andrei Șaguna National College (Brașov) =

- Colegiul Național "Andrei Șaguna"
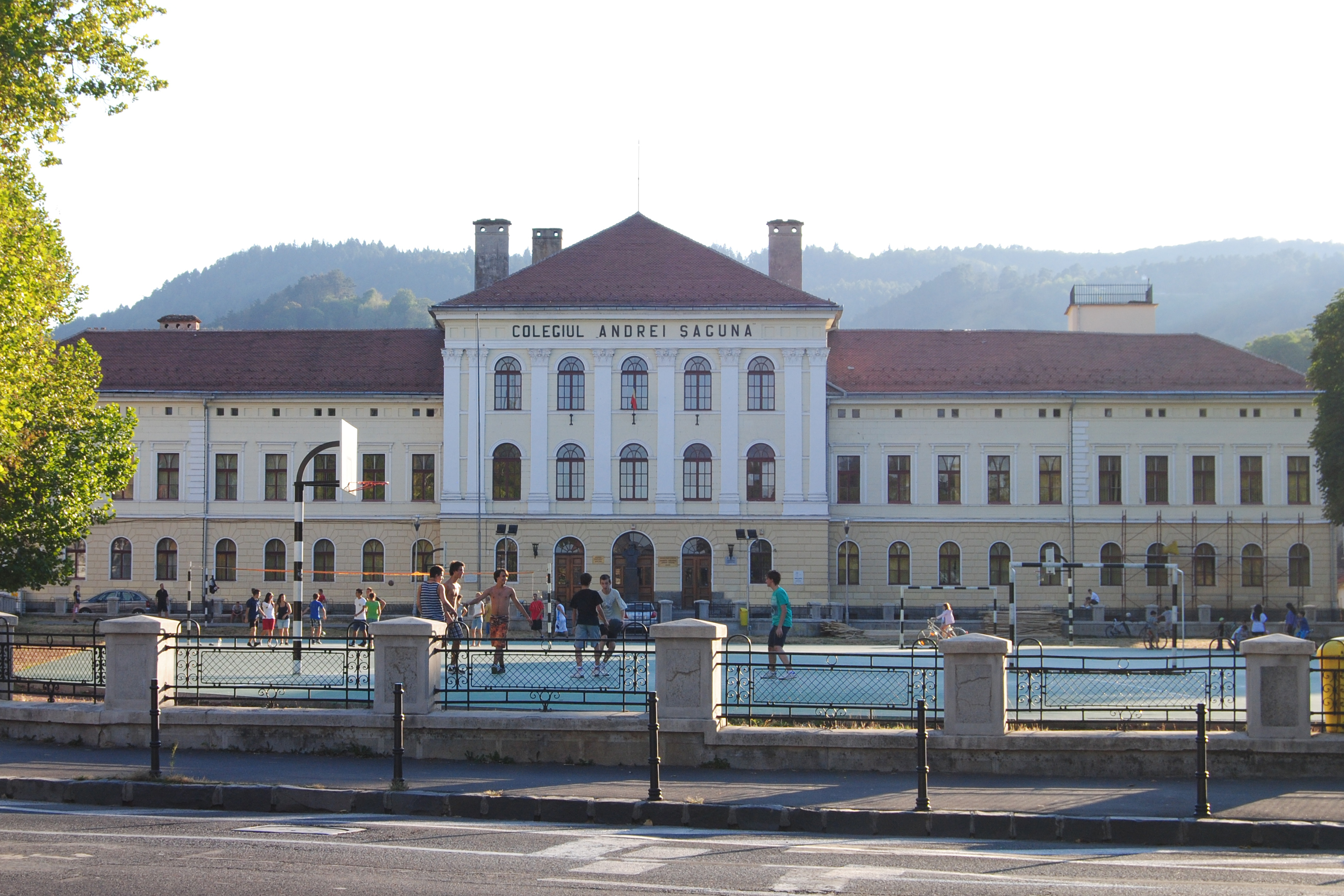

Location
- Șirul Andrei Șaguna, Nr. 1 Brașov, Brașov County; Romania
- Coordinates: 45.6381°N 25.5836°E

Information
- Funding type: Public
- Established: 1850; 176 years ago
- Founder: Andrei Șaguna
- Status: Open
- Category: Middle School and High School
- Grades: 5 to 12
- Gender: coeducation
- Age range: 11–19
- Average class size: 28
- Language: Romanian
- Hours in school day: 5–7
- Campus type: Urban
- Website: www.saguna.ro

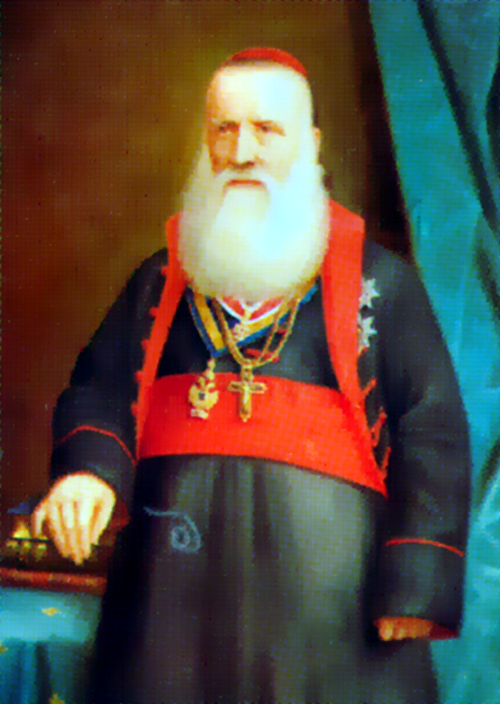
Andrei Șaguna, school founder

Andrei Șaguna National College (Romanian: Colegiul Național "Andrei Șaguna") is a Romanian state school located at 1 Șirul Andrei Șaguna in Șcheii Brașovului, the historically Romanian neighbourhood of Brașov. The school educates children aged between 11 (5th grade – gymnasium) and 19 years old (12th grade – high school). It is considered to be the 5th best school in the country (2014, 2015). At the 2024 evaluation of Romanian secondary schools, the college came in 11th place, with a score of 9.44/10.

Since its founding in 1850, the school has had a number important Romanian personalities as either alumni or former teachers, including Lucian Blaga, Augustin Bunea, Gheorghe Bogdan-Duică, Emil Cioran, Gheorghe Dima, Victor Giurgiu, Octavian Goga, Vasile Goldiș, Titu Maiorescu, Ciprian Porumbescu, Dumitru Stăniloae, and Eugen Jebeleanu.
