= Berthold Ribbentrop =

Late 19th century forestry official in India

Berthold Ribbentrop CIE was a pioneering forester from Germany who worked in India with Sir Dietrich Brandis and others. He is said to have inspired Rudyard Kipling's character of Muller in In the Rukh (1893), one of the earliest of his Jungle Book stories.

Berthold Ribbentrop was Inspector-General of Forests to the Government of India from 1885. In 1900 he wrote Forestry in British India, in which he wrote that he was coming to the end of his career. He described the early lack of forestry expertise among the British administrators of India, and wrote

Mr. Brandis, the then Inspector-General of Forests, was permitted, towards the close of 1866, to select two young officers trained for the Forest Service in Germany, one of these was Dr. William Schlich, my predecessor as Inspector-General of Forests and now head of the Coopers Hill Forest School, the other myself.
