= Revista pădurilor =

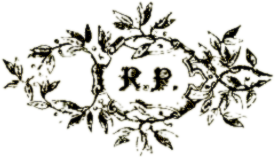
- Logo of Revista pădurilor
- Language: Romanian
- Edited by: Societatea Progresul Silvic

Publication details
- History: 1882–present
- Publisher: Societatea Progresul Silvic
- Frequency: Bimonthly
- Open access: yes
- License: CC BY-NC-ND 3.0

Standard abbreviations
- ISO 4: Rev. Pădur.

Indexing
- ISSN: 1583-7890 (print); 2067-1962 (web)

Links
- Journal homepage

Revista pădurilor (Journal of Forests) is a Romanian peer-reviewed scientific journal established in 1882 that has appeared without interruption since 1886, making it the oldest Romanian journal published without interruption and one of the oldest forestry journals in the world. It is published by the Societatea Progresul Silvic. The tables of contents of the issues since 1886 are published on its website, and, since 2009, the full text of articles is also available online.

== Indexing ==
Revista pădurilor is abstracted and indexed in CABI and RePEc.

== See also ==
- List of forestry journals
