= Viškovci =

- Municipality
- Location in Croatia Viškovci (Croatia)
- Coordinates: 45.34°N 18.45°E
- Country: Croatia
- Region: Slavonia
- County: Osijek-Baranja County

Government
  - Mayor: Petar Zorić

Area
  - Municipality: 44.0 km^{2} (17.0 sq mi)
  - Urban: 25.7 km^{2} (9.9 sq mi)

Population (2021)
  - Municipality: 1,496
  - Density: 34.0/km^{2} (88.1/sq mi)
  - Urban: 920
  - Urban density: 36/km^{2} (93/sq mi)
- Time zone: UTC+1 (Central European Time)
- Website: viskovci.hr

Viškovci (Hungarian: Viskolc) is a village and a municipality in Osijek-Baranja County, Croatia.

In the 2011 census, there were 1,906 inhabitants in the municipality, in the following settlements:

- Forkuševci, population 468
- Viškovci, population 1,144
- Vučevci, population 294

== Name ==
The name of the village in Croatian is plural.
