= Wilhelm Schlich =

German-born English scholar and forestry administrator

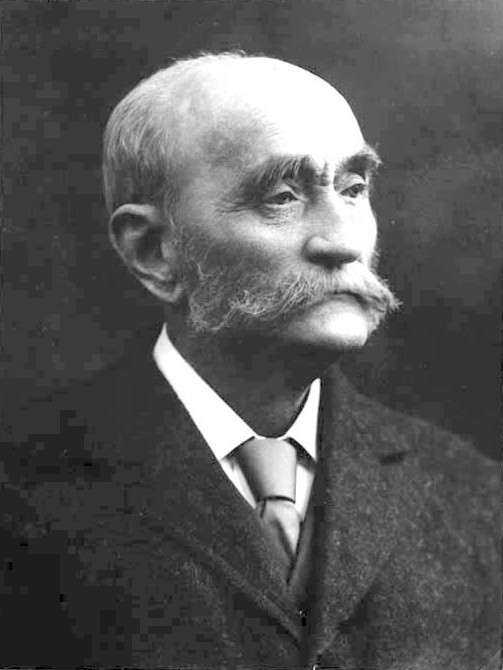
Sir William Schlich in ca 1910

Sir Wilhelm Philipp Daniel Schlich KCIE FRS FLS (28 February 1840 in Flonheim – 28 September 1925 in Oxford), also known as William Schlich, was a German-born forester who worked extensively in India for the British administration. As a professor at Cooper's Hill, he influenced colonial forestry across the British colonies. His major work was a five volume Manual of Forestry (1889–96).

== Biography ==
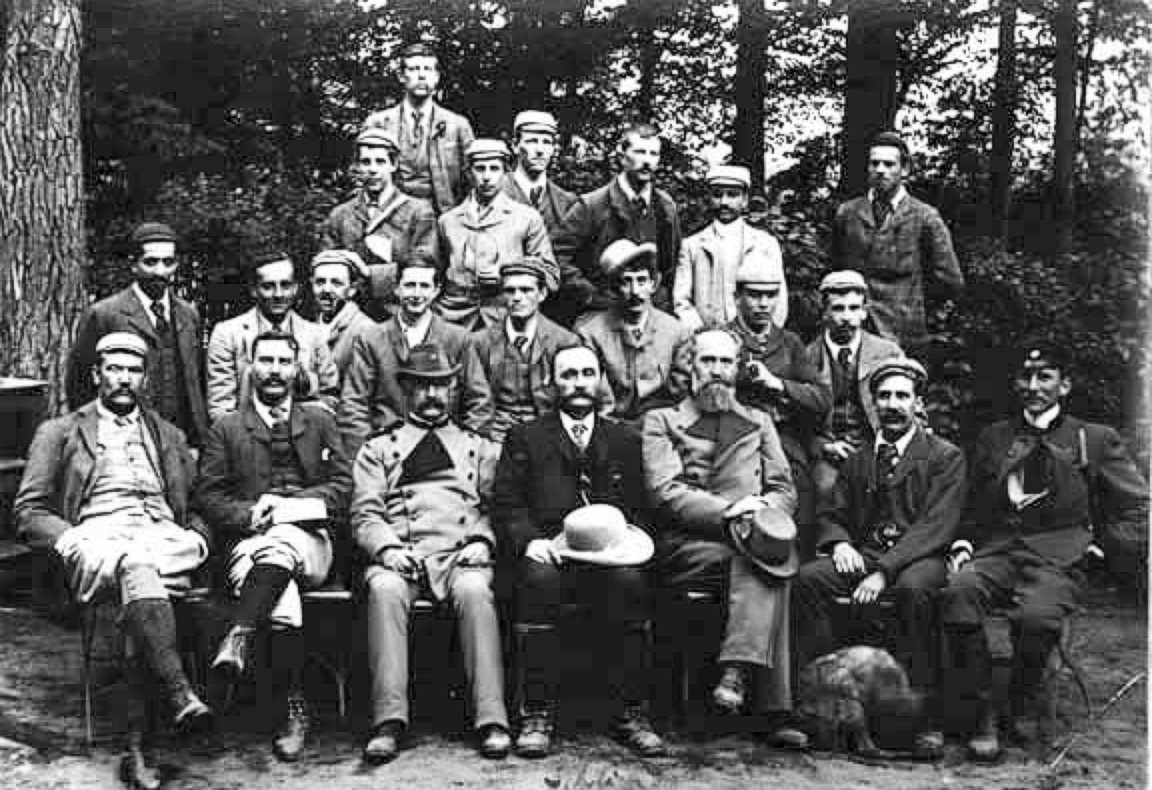
Schlich, in the middle of the seated row, with students from the forestry school at Oxford, on a visit to the forests of Saxony in 1892

William was born to Daniel Schlich and Charlotte Frank. Both parents came from Hessian families and Daniel was a Lutheran pastor or Kirchenrat. His early education was at Flonheim and then at Langgöns and other schools in Hesse where the family moved. Schlich attended the Gymnasium in Darmstadt (1851).

In 1855, he entered the University of Giessen, where he studied under Gustav Heyer (1826-1883). Graduating in 1862, he joined the Hesse forestry service and was appointed Oberförster in Homberg in 1865. He received a doctoral degree in 1867 from Giessen. The Austro-Prussian War of 1866 forced him to move, and, on Heyer's recommendation, he entered the British Imperial Indian Forest Service. Arriving in India in February 1867, his first posting was in Burma. He was promoted and worked in Sindh and later Bengal, becoming Conservator of Forests in 1871, and Inspector-General of Forests in 1883, succeeding his mentor Dietrich Brandis. He developed forest management and education programmes and spent 19 years in India, helping to establish the journal Indian Forester in 1874 (becoming its first honorary editor) and the school at Dehradun in 1877.

In 1885 Schlich moved to England to take up the pioneering post of Professor of Forestry at the Royal Indian Engineering College at Cooper's Hill, near Egham, Surrey, the first formal forestry course in England. He became a British citizen in 1886. In 1905, upon the closure of the college at Cooper's Hill, he moved to Oxford, to found Oxford's forestry programme. He retired on 1 January 1920 and lived on at Oxford where he died on 28 September 1925 from a bronchial infection. He is buried at Wolvercote.

Schlich was a colleague and mentor of Gifford Pinchot. He was made a Fellow of the Royal Society in 1901, awarded the Knight Commander of the Indian Empire in 1909 and was an Honorary Fellow of St John's College.

Following Schlich’s death in 1925, a fund was raised by Oxford to establish an award in his name. After awards were given in several countries, the Society of American Foresters (SAF) permanently adopted the award to recognize outstanding contributions to the field of forestry. SAF presented the first Sir William Schlich Memorial Award to Franklin D. Roosevelt in 1935 and the second Schlich Memorial Award to Gifford Pinchot in 1940.

== Works ==
Schlich was the author of the five-volume Manual of Forestry (1889–96) published serially in three editions. The first two volumes were on silviculture, the others dealing with forest management, forest protection, and forest utilisation. His Manual became the standard and enduring textbook for forestry students. In 1904 he published Forestry in the United Kingdom. Other publications were The Outlook of the World's Timber Supply and Afforestation in Great Britain and Ireland.

== Personal life ==
Schlich married Mary Margaret Smith in 1874. She was English, the daughter of the lexicographer Sir William Smith. In 1874 he changed the spelling of his name from Wilhelm to William. The marriage produced one son who died early and one daughter, Gertrude. Following the death of his first wife in 1878, he married Adèle Emilie Mathilde Marsily, member of an Antwerp family originally from Italy. They had a son and three daughters. He is buried in Wolvercote Cemetery, Oxford. The composer Humphrey Searle was his grandson.

== See also ==
- List of members of German student corps
