= Croatian Forestry Society =

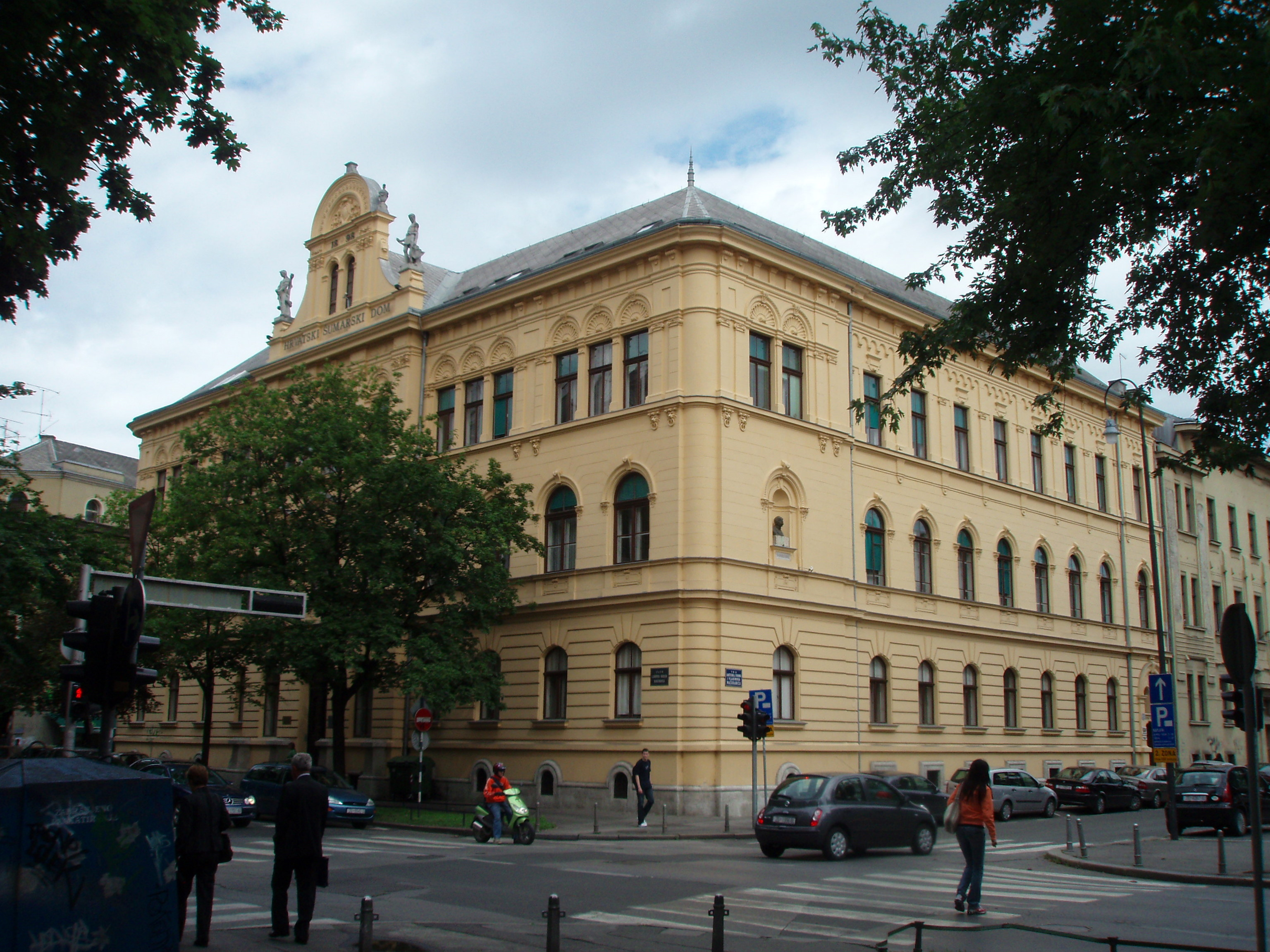
Croatian Forestry House in Zagreb

The Croatian Forestry Society (Croatian: Hrvatsko šumarsko društvo) has its origins in the Croatian-Slavonian Agricultural Society, founded at the initiative of foresters in Zagreb in 1841. The Society's forestry section was created on the December 26, 1846, in Prečec near Zagreb; this marks the beginning of the Croatian Forestry Society.

The Forestry Society is responsible for many of the accomplishments of forestry practice, education and science in Croatia, including:

- Enactment of the Law on Forests in the year 1852, and its strict application six years later;
- Founding of the Royal Agriculture and Forestry College (today the College of Agriculture) in Križevci in 1860;
- Publishing of the first scientific forestry-specialized publication in southeast Europe, Šumarski list ("Journal of Forestry"), beginning on January 1, 1877, which has since been continuously published to this day;
- Preparation and participation in the Budapest Millennium Exhibition in 1896, where the Kingdom of Croatia-Slavonia had its showroom, and forestry and wood processing its own special pavilion;
- Construction of the Croatian Forestry House (in today's Ivan Mažuranić Square, Zagreb) in 1898, home to the Forestry Academy (Šumarska akademija) beginning on 20 October. The Forestry Academy was the fourth institution of higher education at the University of Zagreb.

The Forestry Society now numbers around 2700 members.
