= Criteria and indicators of sustainable forest management =

Criteria & Indicators of Sustainable Forest Management (C&I) are policy instruments by which sustainability of forest management in the country/region, or progress towards Sustainable forest management (SFM), may be evaluated and reported on. C&I is a conjunctive term for a set of objectives and the variables/descriptions allowing to evaluate whether the objectives are achieved or not.

There are many various sets of C&I in the world that are used by particular regional SFM processes (e.g. FOREST EUROPE, Montréal Process), international organisations and their activities (e.g. FAO Global Forest Resources Assessment) or certification of forest management and forest products (e.g. Forest Stewardship Council, Programme for the Endorsement of Forest Certification). Signatory countries of particular processes or certification schemes can develop their national sets derived from the set of process/scheme.

== Possible uses of criteria and indicators ==
Criteria and indicators of sustainable forest management:

- help to define, understand and promote the concept of sustainable forest management;
- provide a common framework for signatory countries to:
  - describe, monitor, assess and report on national forest trends (if measured periodically);
  - describe, monitor, assess and report on progress towards sustainable forest management (if measured periodically);
- reflect a holistic approach to forests as ecosystems, highlighting the full range of forest values;
- facilitate policy dialogue and the development of policies or strategies;
- help to implement forest related policies, plans and programmes;
- contribute to cross-sectoral sustainability assessments, as well as assessments for other sectors (e.g. environment, energy, climate change, agriculture, sustainable land management);
- guide forest management practice;
- help to identify the changes in forest management;
- help to develop forest certification principles, standards and indicators.

== Levels of use ==
Criteria and indicators are applied at different levels:

- global – the sets of C&I for global use have to be universal enough for the various biogeographic regions, countries at different stages of development of forestry (with different ability to provide data), etc.;
- regional (supranational regions, such as pan-European, are meant);
- national and sub-national;
- local (forest management units, community forestry land, concession areas and other) - as being focused on much smaller scale, the sets for this level can significantly differ from sets for the above-mentioned levels and they are used mainly for forest certification purposes.

== Early history ==
The first FAO Global Forest Resources Assessment was published in 1948. It consisted of five indicators, however, they were focused more to assessment of timber availability, than to sustainability of forest management as a whole.

The history of the idea of C&I of SFM dates back to 1992 when the United Nations Conference on Environment and Development adopted the “Forest Principles”* and Chapter 11 of Agenda 21. Approximately at the same time, the International Tropical Timber Organization (ITTO) started its work on “Criteria for the Measurement of Sustainable Tropical Forest Management.” After this summit, the concept of “criteria and indicators for sustainable forest management” has started to be more and more internationally accepted.

== Forest Europe: Pan-European criteria and indicators for sustainable forest management ==
The first set of Pan-European C&I, based on documents adopted by two Expert Level Follow-Up Meetings of the Helsinki Conference, was adopted by the third Ministerial Conference on the Protection of Forests in Europe on 2–4 June 1998 in Lisbon/Portugal as an Annex 1 of the Resolution L2. This set consisted of 6 Criteria of SFM, 20 quantitative indicators and 80 descriptive indicators (4 per each quantitative indicator).

In the meantime, knowledge and data collection systems gradually developed further. At the same time, information needs have been changing. Thus, initiated by the Lisbon Conference, the MCPFE decided to improve the existing C&I set. A document named Improved Pan-European Indicators for Sustainable Forest Management was adopted at the MCPFE Expert Level Meeting, 7–8 October 2002 in Vienna, Austria (before Vienna Conference). The 6 criteria remained unchanged, however, the number of quantitative indicators increased to 35, and the system of descriptive indicators, renamed to qualitative indicators, was significantly simplified to 17 indicators.

The last update of Pan-European set was performed before Madrid Conference at the "Forest Europe" Expert Level Meeting 30 June – 2 July 2015, in Madrid, Spain. The set of quantitative indicators was slightly altered (34 indicators); the system of qualitative indicators was further simplified to 11 indicators, 5 of them now forming something like an "unofficial 7th criterion", while the remaining 6 are the official 6 criteria.

=== Criteria ===
Criteria characterise or define the essential elements or set of conditions or processes by which sustainable forest management may be assessed (MCPFE, 1998b). There are 6 criteria in the Pan-European set:

1. Maintenance and Appropriate Enhancement of Forest Resources and their Contribution to Global Carbon Cycles
2. Maintenance of Forest Ecosystem Health and Vitality
3. Maintenance and Encouragement of Productive Functions of Forests (Wood and Non-Wood)
4. Maintenance, Conservation and Appropriate Enhancement of Biological Diversity in Forest Ecosystems
5. Maintenance and Appropriate Enhancement of Protective Functions in Forest Management (notably soil and water)
6. Maintenance of other socioeconomic functions and conditions

=== Indicators ===
The indicators monitor changes over time for each criterion and describe the progress made towards their objectives (MCPFE, 1998a).

- Quantitative indicators are expressed in measurement units and the necessary data are collected via regular forest inventories, other field surveys, remote sensing, etc. Periodically measured indicators show the direction of change regarding the criterion. The list of quantitative indicators includes, for example, the forest area and growing stock (volume of living wood) for the Criterion 1, forest damage for the Criterion 2, increment and fellings for the Criterion 3, deadwood volume or naturalness classes for the Criterion 4, the area of protective forests for the Criterion 5, and contribution of forests to GDP or the area of recreation forests for the Criterion 6.
- Qualitative indicators are those that have to be described and assessed, and the data are collected using questionnaires. They are used to describe legal and institutional frameworks of forestry, as well as the policies and instruments for the implementation of SFM.

== Montréal Process ==
The Montréal Process Working Group on C&I for the Conservation and Sustainable Management of Temperate and Boreal Forests was launched in 1994 as a response to the Rio Forest Principles. Original set of C&I was adopted by Santiago Declaration in 1995. Originally it consisted of 7 criteria and 67 indicators. The current set represents the 5th version of MP C&I and it has 7 criteria and 54 indicators (both qualitative and quantitative).

=== Criteria ===
1. Conservation of biological diversity
2. Maintenance of productive capacity of forest ecosystems
3. Maintenance of forest ecosystem health and vitality
4. Conservation and maintenance of soil and water resources
5. Maintenance of forest contribution to global carbon cycles
6. Maintenance and enhancement of long-term multiple socio-economic benefits to meet # the needs of societies
7. Legal, social, and economic framework for forest conservation and sustainable management
