= IFSA =

IFSA can refer to the following:

- International Federation of Strength Athletes
- International Finance Student Association
- International Forestry Students' Association
- International Free Skiers Association
