= Ministerial Conference on the Protection of Forests in Europe =

FOREST EUROPE
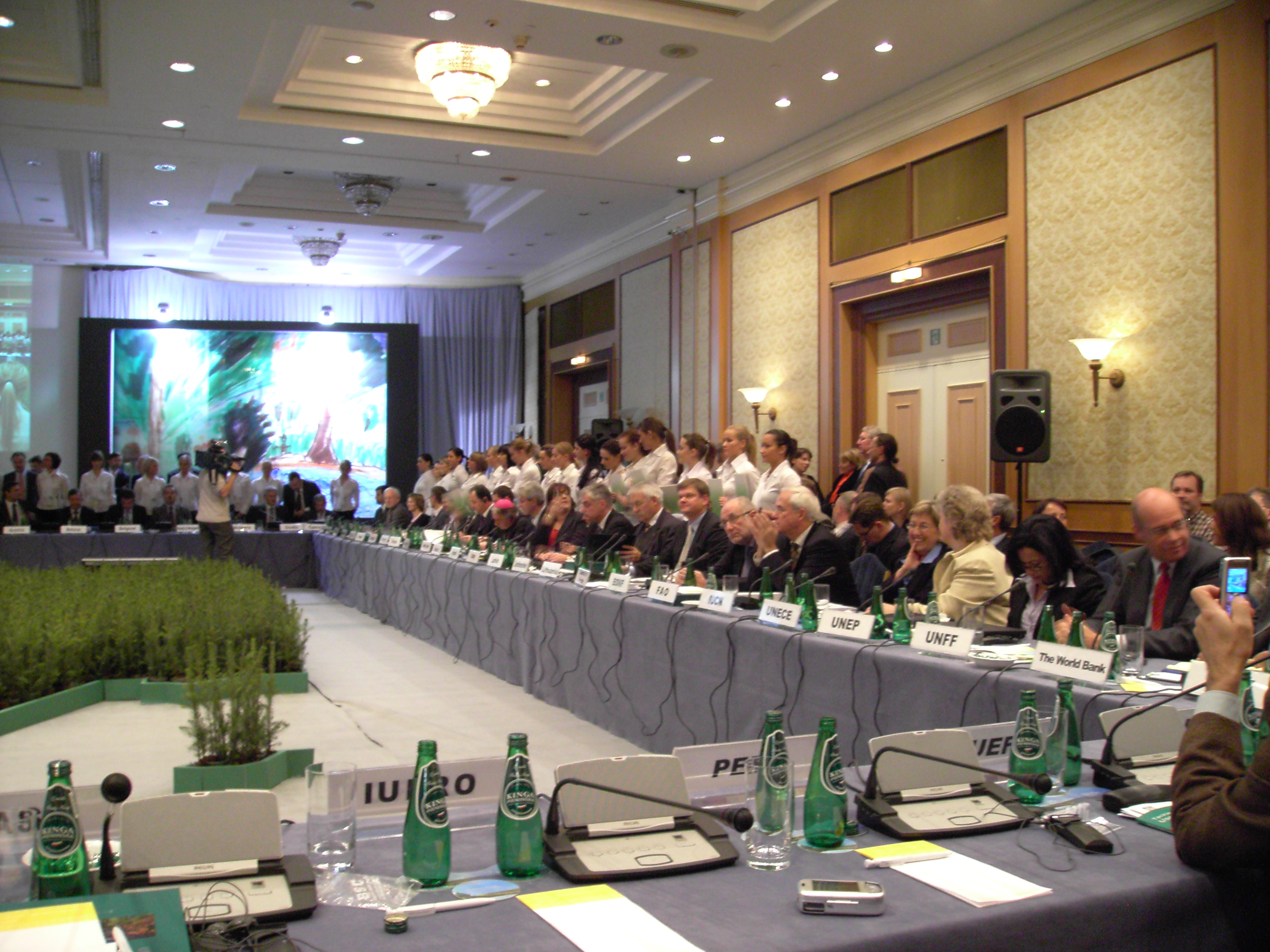
- Ministers signing the documents of MCPFE-5 in Warsaw, 2007
- Established: 1990; 36 years ago
- Founded at: Strasbourg, France
- Legal status: pan-European voluntary political process
- Purpose: sustainable forest management
- Headquarters: Bonn, Germany
- Region served: Europe
- Members: 45
- Main organ: Liaison Unit, General Coordination Committee
- Website: foresteurope.org
- Formerly called: Ministerial Conference on the Protection of Forest in Europe

The Ministerial Conference on the Protection of Forests in Europe (MCPFE, synonym of the Helsinki Process, and, from November 2009, of FOREST EUROPE) is a pan-European ministerial level voluntary political process for the promotion of sustainable management of European forests.

Through this process, guidelines, criteria & indicators of sustainable forest management and other instruments for the promotion of sustainable forest management (SFM) are developed.

The process is based on the Ministerial Conferences that have been convened with an interval of 3 to 5 years. These Conferences represent the highest decision-making body of the process, as well as its most important event. At Ministerial Conferences, the ministers responsible for forests in Europe take decisions on issues of the highest political and social relevance regarding forests and forestry through decisions and resolutions. Between ministerial conferences, the Expert Level Meeting (ELM) is a decision-making body of FOREST EUROPE. On top of that, ad hoc round table meetings, working groups, seminars and workshops are being established to work on specific subjects of scientific, technical or political nature.

FOREST EUROPE also has its supportive structures, namely the General Coordinating Committee (GCC) that coordinates the FOREST EUROPE work and advises the Liaison Unit on implementation of FOREST EUROPE decisions and on strategic developments. The Liaison Unit is the support office of the process. It organises and carries out all FOREST EUROPE meetings and prepares reports and necessary documentation for the meetings. The Liaison Unit is located in the country which holds the chairmanship of FOREST EUROPE – currently in Bonn, Germany, under the name of Liaison Unit Bonn.

== Ministerial Conferences and commitments ==
From 1990, eight (plus one extraordinary) Ministerial Conferences on the Protection of Forests in Europe have taken place. The last Ministerial Conference took place in Bratislava in spring 2021 (virtually). At every Conference, a joint political declaration is agreed and different resolutions are adopted, in order to develop common strategies for its 46 signatory countries and the European Union on how to protect and sustainably manage forests.

=== Strasbourg (1990) ===
- Strasbourg Resolution S1 "Monitoring of Forest Ecosystems"
- Strasbourg Resolution S2 "Genetic Resources"
- Strasbourg Resolution S3 "Data Bank on Forest Fires"
- Strasbourg Resolution S4 "Adapting the Management of Mountain Forests"
- Strasbourg Resolution S5 "Research on Tree Physiology"
- Strasbourg Resolution S6 "Research into Forest Ecosystems"

=== Helsinki (1993) ===
- Helsinki Resolution H1 "General Guidelines for the Sustainable Management of Forests in Europe"
- Helsinki Resolution H2 "General Guidelines for the Conservation of the Biodiversity"
- Helsinki Resolution H3 "Cooperation with Countries with Economies in Transition"
- Helsinki Resolution H4 "Adaptation of Forests in Europe to Climate Change"

=== Lisbon (1998) ===
- Lisbon Resolution L1 "Socio-Economic Aspects of Sustainable Forest Management"
- Lisbon Resolution L2 "Pan-European Criteria, Indicators and PEOLG for Sustainable Forest Management"

=== Vienna (2003) ===
- Vienna Resolution Forest V1 "Cross-Sectoral Co-operation and NFPs"
- Vienna Resolution Forest V2 "Economic Viability of SFM"
- Vienna Resolution Forest V3 "Social and Cultural Dimension of SFM"
- Vienna Resolution Forest V4 "Forest Biological Diversity"
- Vienna Resolution Forest V5 "Climate Change and Sustainable Forest Management in Europe"

=== Warsaw (2007) ===
- Warsaw Resolution W1 "Forest, Wood and Energy"
- Warsaw Resolution W2 "Forest and Water"

=== Oslo (2011) ===
In the Oslo Ministerial Conference ministers adopted a decision (the so-called Oslo Ministerial Decision: European Forests 2020) and agreed on a mandate to launch negotiations on a Legally Binding Agreement on Forests in Europe.

- Oslo Ministerial Decision: European Forests 2020
- Oslo Ministerial Mandate for Negotiating a Legally Binding Agreement on Forests in Europe

=== Madrid (2015) ===
Two FOREST EUROPE Ministerial Conferences were held in Madrid in October 2015: the 7th Ministerial Conference on the Protection of Forests in Europe, and a FOREST EUROPE Extraordinary Ministerial Conference that received the results of the work of the Intergovernmental Negotiating Committee for a Legally Binding Agreement on Forests in Europe. The Conferences were held back-to-back, on the following dates: 20–21 October the 7th FOREST EUROPE Ministerial Conference, and 21 October for the Extraordinary Ministerial Conference.

- Madrid Ministerial Declaration: 25 years together promoting Sustainable Forest Management in Europe
- Madrid Ministerial Resolution 1: Forest sector in the center of Green Economy
- Madrid Ministerial Resolution 2: Protection of forests in a changing environment
- Madrid Ministerial Decision: The future direction of FOREST EUROPE
- Madrid Ministerial Decision

=== Bratislava (2021) ===
At the 8th Ministerial Converence on the Protection of Forests in Europe, a Ministerial Declaration and Resolution was signed. Due to the COVID-19 pandemic, the conference took place virtually.

- Bratislava Ministerial Declaration:The Future We Want: The Forests We Need
- Bratislava Ministerial Resolution: Adapting pan-European forests to climate change

== Composition ==
=== Signatories ===
The FOREST EUROPE signatory countries commit themselves to implement at national level the resolutions adopted during the Ministerial Conferences.

Between two Ministerial Conferences, delegates from the different signatory countries take part in different meetings, where the way to put into practice the agreements reached during the Conferences is planned and coordinated.

All the signatory countries inform the Liaison Unit about their implementation of the resolutions.

The number of signatories has increased over the years, and now account for 46 European countries, as well as the European Union: Albania, Andorra, Austria, Belarus, Belgium, Bosnia and Herzegovina, Bulgaria, Croatia, Cyprus, Czech Republic, Denmark, Estonia, Finland, France, Georgia, Germany, Greece, Holy See, Hungary, Iceland, Ireland, Italy, Latvia, Liechtenstein, Lithuania, Luxembourg, Malta, Moldova, Monaco, Montenegro, Netherlands, North Macedonia, Norway, Poland, Portugal, Romania, Russia, Serbia, Slovak Republic, Slovenia, Spain, Sweden, Switzerland, Turkey, Ukraine and the United Kingdom.

=== Observers ===
Non-European countries and different kind of international organizations take also part in the FOREST EUROPE process as observers.

Countries (14)

At the present time (beginning 2015), the number of FOREST EUROPE observer countries totals 14 non-European countries, Canada, USA, India, China, Japan and Morocco among others. This is the list of observer countries at present: Australia, Brazil, Cameroon, Canada, Chile, China, Ghana, India, Japan, Malaysia, Morocco, New Zealand, South Korea and the United States.

Organisations (45)

Intergovernmental organizations such as the Food and Agricultural Organisation of the United Nations (FAO), the United Nations Economic Commission for Europe (UNECE), the United Nations Development Programme (UNDP) the United Nations Forum on Forests (UNFF), and the World Bank are among the observer organizations of the FOREST EUROPE process.

Stakeholders organizations are also represented among the observers, having the opportunity to defend their positions and express their concerns during the different meetings. The stakeholder organizations could be classified into the six following major groups:

1. Youth and students organizations (so far only represented by the International Forestry Students’ Association, IFSA)
2. Forest owners, both public (EUSTAFOR) and private (CEPF, COPA-COGECA, ELO, FECOF, USSE), organizations
3. Forest and forest related industry (CEI-Bois, CEPI)
4. Social ONGs (BWI, UEF...)
5. Scientific organizations (Bioversity International, EFI, IIASA, IUFRO, UNU...)
6. Environmental NGOs (WWF, Greenpeace, Friends of the Earth, Pro-Natura)

As of the beginning of 2015, FOREST EUROPE observers included:

- Alpine Convention
- Association Internationale Forêts Méditerranéennes (AIFM)
- Bioversity International / EUFORGEN (European Forest Genetic Resources Programme)
- Building and Wood Workers International (BWI, former IFBWW)
- Carpathian Convention
- CEI-Bois (European Confederation of Woodworking Industries)
- CEPF (Confederation of European Forest Owners)
- CEPI (Confederation of European Paper Industries)
- CIC (International Council for Game and Wildlife Conservation)
- COPA-COGECA (Committee of Professional Agricultural Organisations and General Committee for Agricultural Cooperation in the European Union)
- Council of Europe
- Council of European Foresters (CEF)
- EFI (European Forest Institute)
- ELO (European Landowners' Organisation)
- ENFE (European Network of Forest Entrepreneurs)
- EOMF (European Observatory of Mountain Forest)
- European Forest Building and Wood Workers (EEBWW)
- European Investment Bank (EIB)
- EUSTAFOR (European State Forest Association)
- FAO (Food and Agriculture Organization of the United Nations)
- FECOF (Fédération Européenne des Communes Forestières)
- FERN
- Friends of the Earth Europe
- FSC (Forest Stewardship Council)
- Greenpeace International
- IFSA (International Forestry Students’ Association)
- IIASA (International Institute for Applied Systems Analysis)
- ILO (International Labour Organization)
- ITTO (International Tropical Timber Organization)
- IUCN (International Union for Conservation of Nature)
- IUFRO (International Union of Forest Research Organizations)
- Mediterranean Model Forest Network (MMFN)
- Montréal Process
- PEFC (Programme for the Endorsement of Forest Certification)
- Pro Natura - Friends of the Earth Switzerland
- Regional Environmental Center (REC)
- UEF (Union of European Foresters)
- UNDP (United Nations Development Programme)
- UNECE (United Nations Economic Commission for Europe)
- UNEP (United Nations Environment Programme)
- UNFF (United Nations Forum on Forests)
- UNU (United Nations University)
- USSE (Union of Foresters of Southern Europe)
- World Bank
- World Wide Fund for Nature

== Structure and functioning ==
Besides the Ministerial Conferences themselves, the FOREST EUROPE process has a more elaborated structure and different working modalities.

=== Ministerial conferences ===
Ministerial Conferences are the core of the FOREST EUROPE process. At these meetings, the ministers in charge of forest related issues in the pan-European region commit themselves and endorse decisions on forests a forestry related issues. Between Ministerial Conferences the FOREST EUROPE process works through different follow up mechanisms (see following points).

=== Expert Level Meetings ===
The Expert Level Meeting (ELM) is the FOREST EUROPE decision-making body between the Ministerial Conferences. Delegates from the signatory countries, the observer countries and observer organizations of the FOREST EUROPE process gather in these Expert Level Meetings to take decisions on the implementation of the resolutions and commitments taken during the Ministerial Conferences, as well as the preparations of upcoming Conferences. The ELM meets once or twice a year depending on its needs.

=== Round Table Meetings ===
The Round Table Meetings are a platform for information and opinion exchange. The meetings provide guidance on the implementation of the FOREST EUROPE decisions and resolutions, as well as the strategic development of the process.

=== Working groups, seminars and workshops ===
FOREST EUROPE working groups, seminars and workshops are organized to deal with and debate about specific scientific, technical or political topics related t forests. FOREST EUROPE delegates, as well as nominated experts take part in these meetings, the outcomes of which are always presented to the subsequent Expert Level Meeting.

=== General Coordinating Committee ===
The General Coordinating Committee (GCC) coordinates the work of FOREST EUROPE. It is currently composed of representatives from 4 of the FOREST EUROPE signatory countries, but the number of countries represented in the GCC has changed over time. The GCC is also the financing body of the FOREST EUROPE process and the Liaison Unit and its activities. It is also in charge of advising the Liaison Unit about the implementation of FOREST EUROPE decisions and strategic developments.

The first two Ministerial Conferences on the Protection of Forests in Europe were jointly organized by France and Finland and then Finland and Portugal, on their own initiative. At the second Ministerial Conference, held in Helsinki, the participants recognized the continuity and guiding of the follow-up of the process in hands of a co-chairmanship and placed a structure of cooperation in the form of the GCC.

The committee, on a voluntary basis and regionally balanced, was first constituted by three countries and broadened to five countries afterwards. The following countries have been a member of the GCC since the beginning of the Ministerial Conference process: France, Finland, Portugal, Austria, Poland, Norway, Spain, Slovak Republic, Germany, Turkey and Sweden, since the 7th FOREST EUROPE Ministerial Conference.

In accordance with the established practice of FOREST EUROPE, one of the countries represented in the GCC is always the host country of the previous Ministerial Conference, other is the country which holds the chairmanship of the process and will convene the next Ministerial Conference, and the others are countries which will succeed in the line of chairing FOREST EUROPE. At present, the GCC is constituted by Slovak Republic (host country of the last Ministerial Conference), Germany (host country of the next Ministerial Conference), Turkey and Sweden, which replaced Norway in the GCC at the 7th FOREST EUROPE Ministerial Conference. The chairmanship of the process was taken over from the Slovak Republic at the Bratislava conference by Germany, which will host the next FOREST EUROPE Ministerial Conference. In accordance with the established practice of FOREST EUROPE, the General Coordinating Committee consists of the country which holds the chairmanship of the process and will convene the next Ministerial Conference (Germany), the country which organised the previous Ministerial Conference (Slovak Republic) and three more countries which will succeed in the line of chairing FOREST EUROPE.

=== Liaison Unit ===
The Liaison Unit is the support office of the FOREST EUROPE process. It organises and carries out all FOREST EUROPE meetings and prepares the reports and all the necessary documentation for the meetings. The Liaison Unit is located in the country which holds the chairmanship of FOREST EUROPE – currently in Bonn, Germany, under the name of Liaison Unit Bonn.
