= Trempealeau =

Trempealeau, Wisconsin may refer to:

- Trempealeau (town), Wisconsin, a town in the U.S. state of Wisconsin
- Trempealeau (village), Wisconsin, a village in the U.S. state of Wisconsin
- Trempealeau County, Wisconsin, a county in the US state of Wisconsin

== See also ==
- Trempealeau Morninglight (2001–2016), American skier
