= FNUF =

FNUF may refer to:

- United Nations Forum on Forests (UNFF), in its French-language abbreviation
- Front national pour l’unité française, a predecessor of the French right-wing party Front National
