= American Tree Farm System =

Woodland certification system in the United States

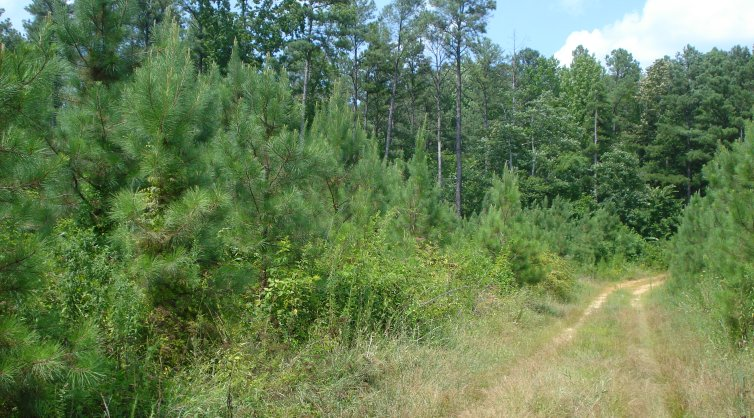
An ATFS-certified tree farm in Virginia provides a variety of habitats for wildlife while producing wood

The American Tree Farm System (ATFS) is the largest and oldest woodland certification system in America. It is internationally recognized by the Programme for the Endorsement of Forest Certification and meets strict third-party certification standards.

It is one of three certification systems currently recognized in the United States (the others include the Forest Stewardship Council and the Sustainable Forestry Initiative). ATFS specializes in certifying private forests, primarily those held by individuals and families and currently certifies over 24 million acres (110,000 km²) of forestland. The ATFS Standard for Certification is owned by the American Forest Foundation, a national nonprofit organization whose mission is to "deliver meaningful conservation impact through the empowerment of family forest owners."

== History ==
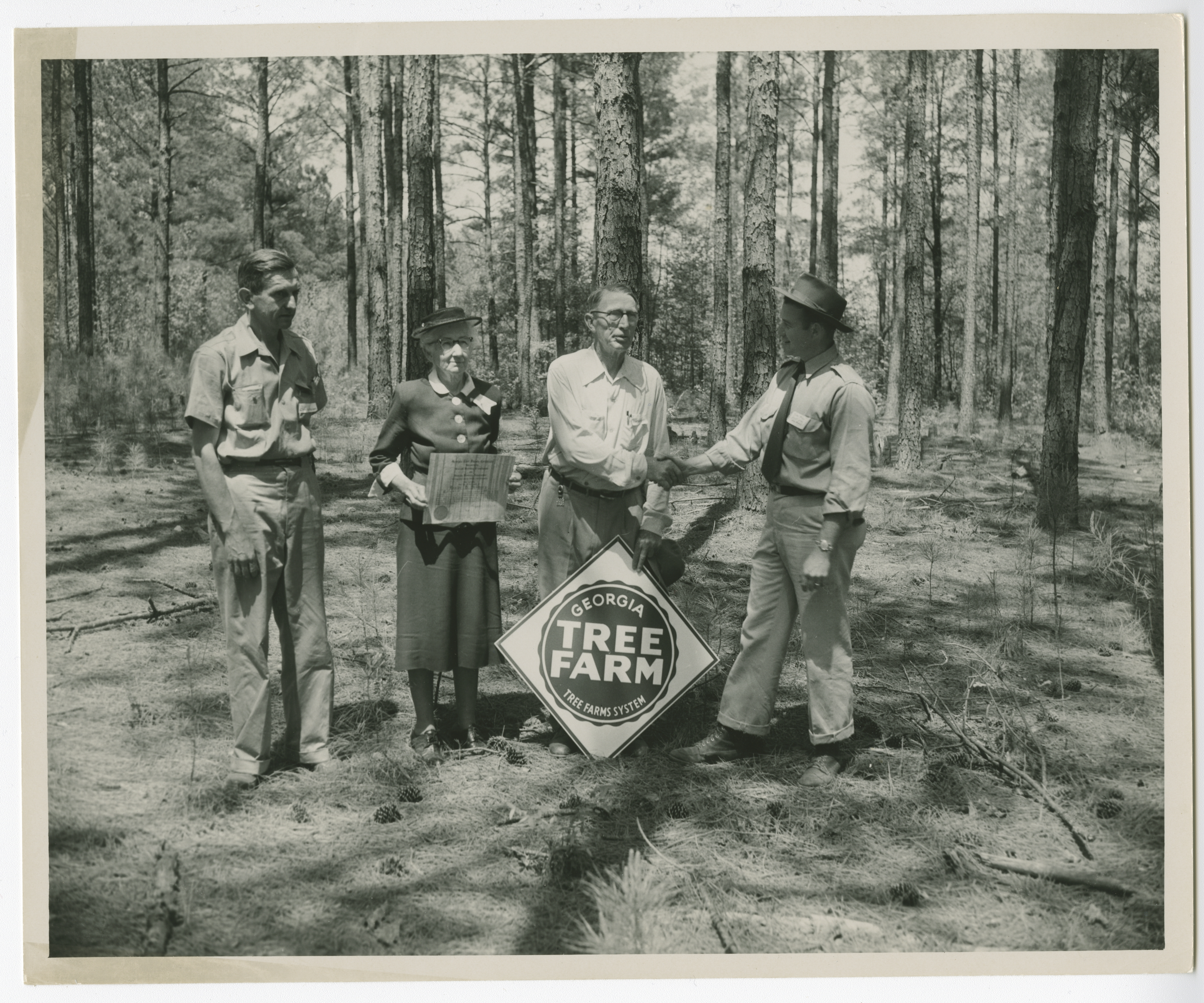
Certificate being presented to a tree farmer in Columbia County, Georgia, circa 1950s

The tree farm movement began in 1941 in an effort to promote resources on private land, ensuring plentiful fiber production for timber and paper companies. With declining virgin saw timber available, the industry began to promote forestry practices to ensure sufficient fiber production for the future. Prior to 1941, the majority of fiber came from industrial lands. The first tract of land labeled as a Tree Farm was organized and marketed by the Weyerhaeuser Company to help change public attitudes toward timber production and protect natural resources from forest fires and other natural disasters. This first official tree farm, the 120,000-acre Clemons Tree Farm, was dedicated in Montesano, Washington, on June 12, 1941. The title of "tree farm" was chosen in large part because Weyerhaeuser felt that the 1940s public understood farming as crop production, and similarly tree farming was focused on producing more timber, with frequent replanting post-harvest. The early sponsors of the tree-farming movement defined it as "privately owned forest-land dedicated to the growing of forest crops for commercial purposes, protected and managed for continuous production of forest products." Alabama was the first state to launch a statewide tree farm system, and a formal dedication ceremony was held in Brewton on April 4, 1942, with 25 individuals and companies presented certificates. Emmett N. McCall was certified as the nation's first individual tree farmer. In the early 1940s the concept of "tree-farming" on private land was promoted by American Forest Products Industries, a subsidiary of the National Lumber Manufacturers Association in an organized campaign to engage timberland owners in conservative timber production. In 1954, American Forest Products Industries, under the leadership of William B. Greeley, drafted and approved a “Principles of the American Tree Farm System.” This code established a set criteria for tree farm certification.

Throughout its history, ATFS has relied on celebrity Tree Farmers to relay its message to the public. Celebrities include actor Andy Griffith, actress Andie MacDowell, former President Jimmy Carter, and Rolling Stone keyboardist Chuck Leavell.

== Current ==
Since 1941, the system has shifted to focus on whole stewardship, rather than strictly fiber production. According to the Standards of Certification for ATFS, woodland owners must own 10 or more acres and have a management plan. In that management plan, woodland owners must recognize wildlife habitat, protection of water quality, threatened and endangered species, and sustainable harvest levels. The certification standard is subject to multi-stakeholder involvement in the development and revision of the standard, third-party audits, and a publicly available certification of audit summaries. The minimum acreage to qualify for a tree farm refers to "woodland" i.e., forested land. So acreage which includes grazing or other non-wooded lands must have at least 10 acres in forest to qualify. Furthermore, programs in different areas which support tree farming activities may require larger forested acreages as well as additional criteria. For example, The Forest Ag Program in Colorado requires the following standards:

To be eligible for the Forest Ag Program, properties must meet several criteria:

- The landowner must perform forest management activities to produce tangible wood products for the primary purpose of obtaining a monetary profit. Tangible wood products include transplants, Christmas trees and boughs, sawlogs, posts, poles and firewood.
- The landowner must have at least 40 forested acres.
- The landowner must submit a Colorado State Forest Service-approved forest management plan that is prepared by a professional forester or natural resources professional.

Landowners must annually submit (1) a request for inspection, (2) an inspection fee, (3) an accomplishment report, and (4) an annual work plan for the following year, and have the enrolled property inspected by a CSFS forester.

As a program of the American Forest Foundation (AFF), the American Tree Farm System focuses on the long-term sustainability of America's forests in ecological and economic terms. The vision statement of AFF states, "AFF is committed to creating a future where North American forests are sustained by the public that understand and values the social, economic, and environmental benefits they provide to our communities, our nation, and the world."

== Committees ==
The network of over 90,000 woodland owners is organized through state committees and governed at the national level. Currently 45 of the 50 states have committees. Alaska, Arizona, Hawaii, North Dakota and Utah currently do not have programs. With national coordination, ATFS strives to "work on-the-ground with families...to promote stewardship and protect our nation's forest heritage." The state networks also include tree farm inspectors, who certify the forests and conduct outreach efforts on behalf of ATFS and partnered organizations.

Each year ATFS hosts a National Tree Farmer Convention and awards an individual or family with the National Outstanding Tree Farmer of the Year award. It also awards a National Outstanding Inspector Award to a resource professional who has demonstrated exceptional outreach efforts to engage landowners and the general public in sustainable forestry.

== See also ==
- Oregon Forest Resources Institute
- Private landowner assistance program
