= Sacchettificio Monzese =

Former Italian stationery company

Sacchettificio Monzese S.r.l.
- Industry: Paper products
- Founded: Monza, 1953
- Founder: Cesare Rovelli, Adalgisa Genovesi
- Headquarters: via Salvo d'Acquisto, 2, Vimercate, Italy
- Area served: Worldwide
- Key people: Mauro Rovelli; Milko Rovelli; Marco Rovelli
- Products: Envelopes, EnvEcoLaser
- Website: sacchettificiomonzese.com

Sacchettificio Monzese S.r.l. was a company founded by Cesare Rovelli and Adalgisa Genovesi in 1953. The company manufactured paper envelopes and pockets, both standard and on demand.

The company first became famous for having created, in 1992, the biggest envelopes in the world and so entered in the Guinness World Records of the same year as: World Biggest Envelopes.

In the recent years the company had gained new notoriety for having patented the first paper envelope with windows suitable for laser printing machines, the EnvEcoLaser (Envelope Ecological Laserprint).

== History ==
- 1953 Cesare Rovelli and Adalgisa Genovesi founded the Sacchettificio Monzese. At the beginning, all the products were handmade.
- 1956 The output was quite diversified: paper envelopes, pocket envelopes and cardboard boxes for a famous cake manufacturer, Motta.
- 1970 The business moved to new headquarters and the first automatic open-end paper envelope manufacturing machinery was purchased.
- 1992 The name of Sacchettificio Monzese was recorded in the Guinness Book of Records for the biggest envelopes in the world, together with the Finnish paper manufacturer Veitsiluoto Oy.

- 1996 The business finally moved to the present headquarters in Vimercate.
- 2008 The company achieves the Forest Stewardship Council certification.
- 2009 Sacchettificio Monzese wins the "Brianza Economica" award given by the Chamber of Commerce, Industry, Handicraft and Agriculture of Monza and Brianza.
- 2010 EnvEcoLaser (Envelope Ecological Laserprint), the first paper envelope with windows suitable for laser printing machines, was patented. Furthermore, the company achieves the Programme for the Endorsement of Forest Certification certification.
- 2012 The company closed due to the 2008 financial crisis.

== EnvEcoLaser ==
EnvEcoLaser is the first paper envelope with windows suitable for laser printing machines. This new kind of envelope was created by the Sacchettificio Monzese and patented under the title "Envelope for laser printers and process for the manufacturing of the envelope". The inventors are: Mr. Mauro Rovelli, Mr. Milko Rovelli and Mr. Marco Rovelli.

== Bibliography ==
- "Monza, Sacchettificio da primato mondiale", La Stampa 08/01/1992.
- "Le buste più grandi del mondo", Il giornale della carta 13/01/1992.
- "Monza, ecco le buste da Guinness", La Repubblica 14/01/1992.
- "Un po' per sport e un po' per spot ecco le <<buste delle sette leghe>>", Il Giorno 14/01/1992.
- "Maxi record in busta grande", Il Giornale 14/01/1992.
- "Un <<monumento>> alla busta classica", Giornale di Bergamo 14/01/1992.
- g. c., "Buste da Guinness", Rassegna Grafica 15/01/1992.
- e.c., "...e c'è chi produce buste da 37,9 metri quadrati", il Cittadino 16/01/1992.
- "Da Guinness la <<Regina>> delle buste", Il giornale di Brescia 22/01/1992.
- "Vietato spedirla", Famiglia Cristiana 1992.
