= Forest protection =

Branch of forestry

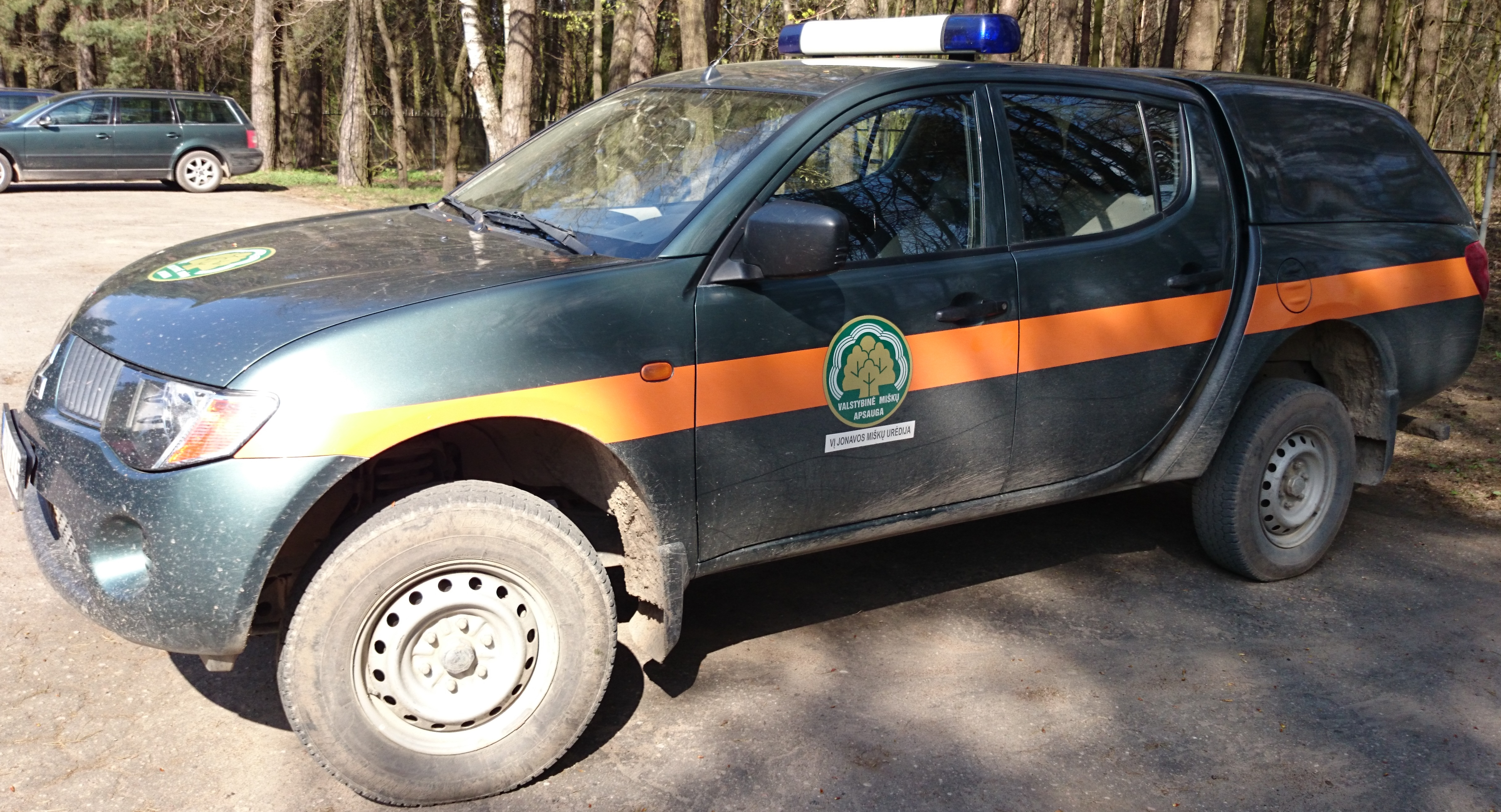
Forest security in Lithuania

Forest protection is a branch of forestry which is concerned with the preservation or improvement of a forest and prevention and control of damage to forest by natural or man made causes like forest fires, plant pests, and adverse climatic conditions (global warming).

Forest protection also has a legal status and rather than protection from only people damaging the forests is seen to be broader and include forest pathology too. Due to the different emphases there exist widely different methods forest protection.

In German-speaking countries, forest protection would focus on the biotic and abiotic factors that are non-crime related. A protected forest is not the same as a protection forest. These terms can lead to some confusion in English, although they are clearer in other languages. As a result, reading English literature can be problematic for non-experts due to localization and conflation of meanings.

The types of man-induced abuse that forest protection seeks to prevent include:

- Aggressive or unsustainable intensive farming and logging
- Pollution of the forest soil
- Expanding city development caused by population explosion and the resulting urban sprawl

There is considerable debate over the effectiveness of forest protection methods. Enforcement of laws regarding purchased forest land is weak or non-existent in most parts of the world. In the increasingly dangerous South America, home of major rainforests, officials of the Brazilian National Agency for the Environment (IBAMA) have recently been shot during their routine duties.

== Land purchase ==
One simple type of forest protection is land acquisition by the state or conservation organisations in order to secure it, or for reforestation / afforestation. It can also mean forest management or the designation of areas such as natural reservoirs which are intended to be left to themselves. However, merely purchasing a piece of land does not prevent it from being used by others for poaching and illegal logging.

== On site monitoring ==
A better way to protect a forest, particularly old growth forests in remote areas, is to obtain a part of it and to live on and monitor the purchased land. Even in the United States, these measures sometimes do not suffice because arson can burn a forest to the ground, leaving burnt areas free for different use.

Another issue about living on purchased forest-land is that there may not be a suitable site for a standard home without clearing land, which defies the purpose of protection. Alternatives include building a treehouse or an earthhouse. This is being done currently by indigenous people in South America to protect large reservoirs. In former times, North American Native Americans used to live in tipies or mandan earthhouses, which also require less land.

== Other methods of protection ==
A number of less successful methods of forest protection have been tried, such as the trade in certified wood. Protecting a small section of land in a larger forest may also have limited value. For example, tropical rainforests can die if they decrease in size, since they are dependent on the moist microclimate which they create. There is an excellent article in National Geographic October issue concerning redwood forest in California and their effort to maintain forest and rainforest.

A compromise is to conduct agriculture and stock farming, or sustainable wood management. This ascribes different values to forest land and farmland, for which many areas are clear felled.

== Neighborhood leakage ==
Two conflicting studies on the idea that protecting forests only relocates deforestation. This is called 'neighborhood leakage'. According to the paradox of forest protection protected areas such as rural settlements near protected zones grew at twice the rate of those elsewhere. The IUCN implements such protocols that protect over 670 eco-regions. 46% of the eco-regions had less than 10% forest protection. Which means that these areas are not being monitored as they should and the protection is not working. Considering forest protection within global priority areas was unsatisfactory. An example given was that the average protection of 8.4% in biodiversity hotspots. Results have policy relevance in terms of the target of the Convention on Biological Diversity, reconfirmed in 2008, to conserve in an effective manner that "at least 10% of each of the world's forest types".

== See also ==
- Agreement on the Application of Sanitary and Phytosanitary Measures
- Conservation biology
- Conservation reliant species
- Ecology
- Ecology movement
- Environmentalism
- Forest conservation
- Forest Principles
- Habitat conservation
- Natural landscape
- Protection forest
- Renewable resource
- Urban forest
