= Greenguard Environmental Institute =

The Greenguard Environmental Institute (corporately styled "GREENGUARD") is an industry-independent organization that aims to protect human health and improve quality of life by enhancing indoor air quality and reducing people’s exposure to chemicals and other pollutants. As an ISO-IEC Guide 65:1996 accredited, third-party certifying body, the Greenguard Environmental Institute certifies products and materials for low chemical emissions and serves as a public resource for choosing healthier products and materials for indoor environments. In 2011, UL Environment, a business unit of UL (Underwriters Laboratories) acquired Greenguard Environmental Institute.

The UL GREENGUARD Certification Program requires that products undergo independent, scientific testing and ongoing monitoring of their chemical emissions. Only products that meet UL Environment’s stringent emissions standards qualify for certification. These standards are based on established criteria from key public health agencies.

More than 10,000 products on the market are UL GREENGUARD Certified, representing over 350 manufacturers and 19 industries. The UL Sustainable Products Database, the organization's online database of certified or validated products, helps people identify certified products and is searchable by product category, manufacturer, sustainable credits, product attributes, and certification type. GREENGUARD Certification is broadly recognized and accepted by sustainable building programs and building codes worldwide.

== History ==
The Greenguard Environmental Institute was founded in 2001 by indoor air quality scientist Dr. Marilyn Black. Her vision was to create a third-party product certifier that could educate consumers and industry professionals about the importance of good indoor air quality and low-emitting products.

=== Greenguard Indoor Air Quality Certification ===
The Greenguard Indoor Air Quality Certification was Greenguard’s first certification offering. Products that are Greenguard Indoor Air Quality Certified meet strict chemical emissions limits and are designed for use in office environments and other indoor spaces. Greenguard Indoor Air Quality Certification gives credence to manufacturers’ sustainability claims, backing them with empirical scientific data from an unbiased, third-party organization.

=== Greenguard Children & Schools Certification (now GREENGUARD GOLD) ===
In 2005, the Greenguard Children & Schools Certification was launched to address the indoor air quality needs of schools, daycares, and other sensitive environments in which children spend a lot of time. As such, it enforces stricter chemical emissions limits than the original certification. The Greenguard Children & Schools standard is referenced by both the Collaborative for High Performance Schools (CHPS) and the Leadership in Energy and Environmental Design (LEED) Building Rating System. In 2013, Greenguard Children & Schools Certification was renamed GREENGUARD GOLD Certification.

== Social media ==
UL Environment actively engages with its key audiences via Twitter, Facebook and LinkedIn accounts.

== See also ==
Environmental Building News (http://www2.buildinggreen.com/article/get-whiff-lowdown-product-emissions-testing-0)

- Certified wood
- Mold growth, assessment, and remediation
