= Martha Isabel Ruiz Corzo =

Mexican environmental activist

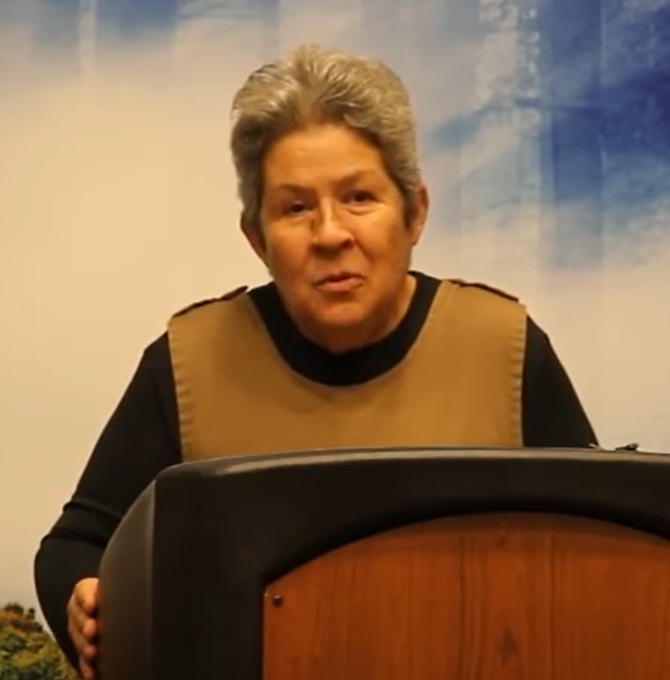
- Ruiz Corzo accepting the Wangari Maathai Forest Champion Award in 2014
- Born: 17 January 1953 (age 73); Mexico City, Mexico
- Other name: "Pati"
- Occupations: Environmentalist; violinist and music teacher (formerly)
- Spouse: Roberto Pedraza Muñoz
- Children: 2
- Website: sierragorda.net

Martha Isabel "Pati" Ruiz Corzo (born 17 January 1953) is a Mexican environmentalist. She is the founder of the Sierra Gorda Ecological Group, which has successfully led grassroots efforts to conserve the Sierra Gorda in central Mexico since 1987. In 2013, she was named a Champion of the Earth by the United Nations Environment Programme (UNEP).

== Early and personal life ==
Martha Isabel Ruiz Corzo was born on 17 January 1953 in Mexico City. She grew up in a wealthy family in Santiago de Querétaro in the central Mexican state of Querétaro. She is most often called "Pati", a nickname derived from the childhood nickname "pata" that her sister called her. Pati took up the violin at age 12, and as a teenager, she became the first violin in the Querétaro Philharmonic Orchestra, a position she held for five years. For 16 years, she taught music at the John F. Kennedy School in Querétaro. She married an economist named Roberto Pedraza Muñoz (born 1950) and had two sons, Roberto ("Beto") and Mario.

However, Ruiz Corzo eventually grew dissatisfied with modern city life. She attributed family health problems to urban pollution and said she felt "suffocated" by upper-class social norms. Seeking a simpler life, the Pedraza Ruiz family moved back to nature in 1984 in the forested mountains of Pedraza Muñoz's home region, the Sierra Gorda in northern Querétaro state.

== Environmental career ==
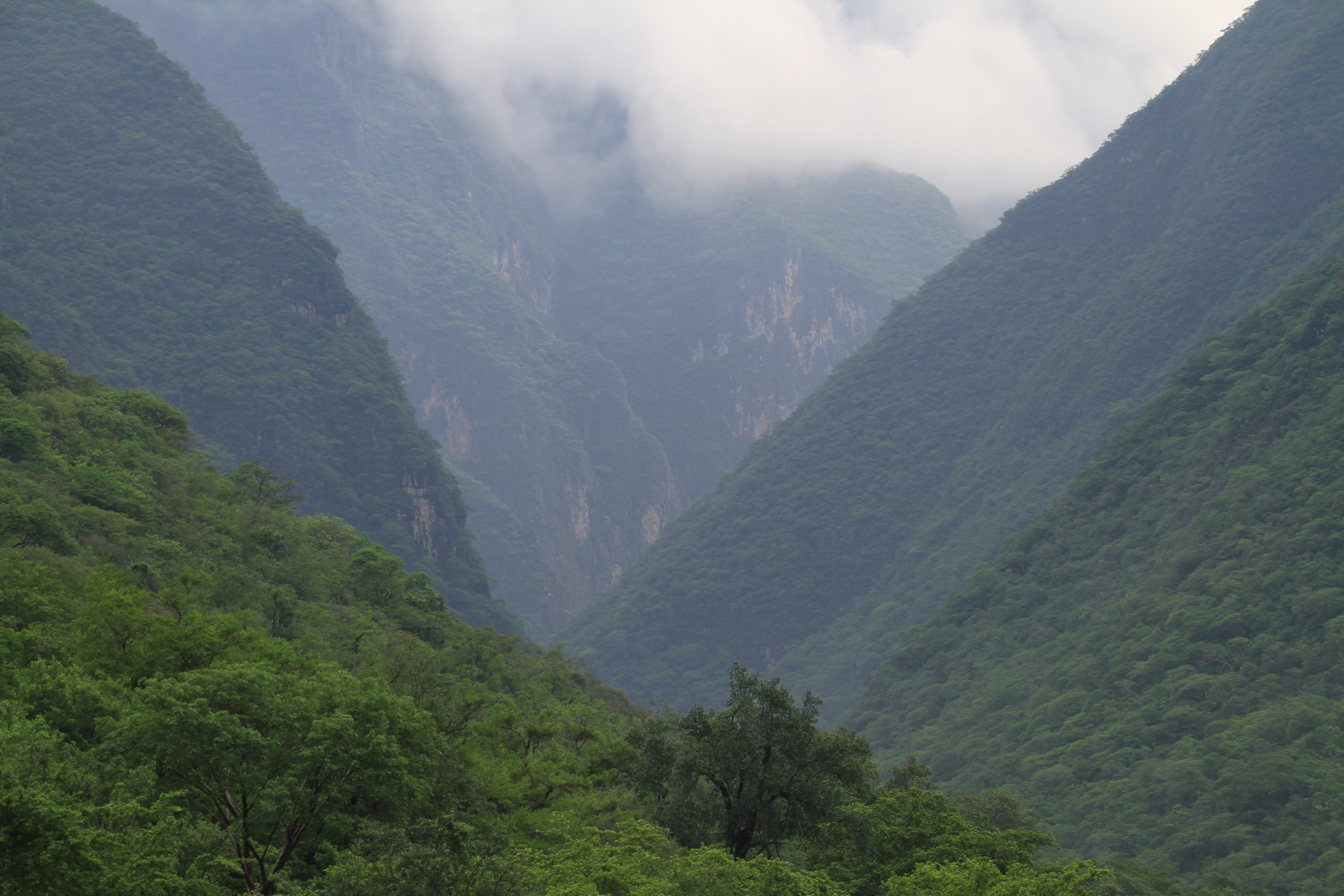
Mountains in the Sierra Gorda Biosphere Reserve

Ruiz Corzo came to prominence for her activism to conserve the diverse ecosystem of the Sierra Gorda. By the 1980s, it was threatened by mining, logging, poaching, littering, water pollution, uncontrolled wildfires, and other issues.

In 1987, Ruiz Corzo and her husband Pedraza Muñoz founded a nonprofit organization, the Sierra Gorda Ecological Group (GESG, Grupo Ecológico Sierra Gorda), to promote sustainability in the region. The group first focused on raising awareness at schools in the Sierra Gorda, holding environmental education events that featured theater and music, including Ruiz Corzo's singing and playing of the accordion. Over time, drawing on Ruiz Corzo's "imposing charisma", GESG generated grassroots support for environmental practices (recycling, reforestation, etc.) among the mostly poor communities of the Sierra Gorda. Nuestra Tierra ("Our Land"), the group's radio show, debuted in 1990. As the group grew, it attracted support from the Governor of Querétaro Enrique Burgos García and earned financial backing from many international groups, such as the World Land Trust and the Global Environment Facility.

GESG petitioned for many years for the Sierra Gorda to be recognized as a biosphere reserve. It was finally successful in May 1997, when President of Mexico Ernesto Zedillo established the Sierra Gorda Biosphere Reserve over about 385,000 hectares (950,000 acres) of land, one-third of Querétaro state. This gave Mexico's environment ministry authority to protect the area's rich ecodiversity. Ruiz Corzo served as the inaugural director of the reserve for 14 years. As director, she helped set up compensation for locals protecting the ecosystem of their land instead of using it for activities like subsistence farming. Ruiz Corzo often fought private and public interests such as the national electric company, which sought to expand electric lines in the reserve despite a ban in the protected area.

As of 2023, GESG continues to help fund and advocate for conservation in many fields, such as sustainable logging, waste management, soil management, ecotourism, and education. One of GESG's initiatives today trains teachers to reach more than 15,000 students in the region annually. Ruiz Corzo resumed leading GESG around 2009, and continues to campaign at local, national, and international levels. The Ecologist magazine wrote in 2016 that Ruiz Corzo "manages to speak to large audiences without fear and she almost always ends a speech by singing".

== Awards ==
Various organizations have recognized Ruiz Corzo for her activism, including two awards from divisions of the United Nations: Champions of the Earth (2013, from the UNEP) and the Wangari Maathai Forest Champion Award (2014, from the UNFF).
