= International Union of Forest Research Organizations =

Non-profit, non-governmental network

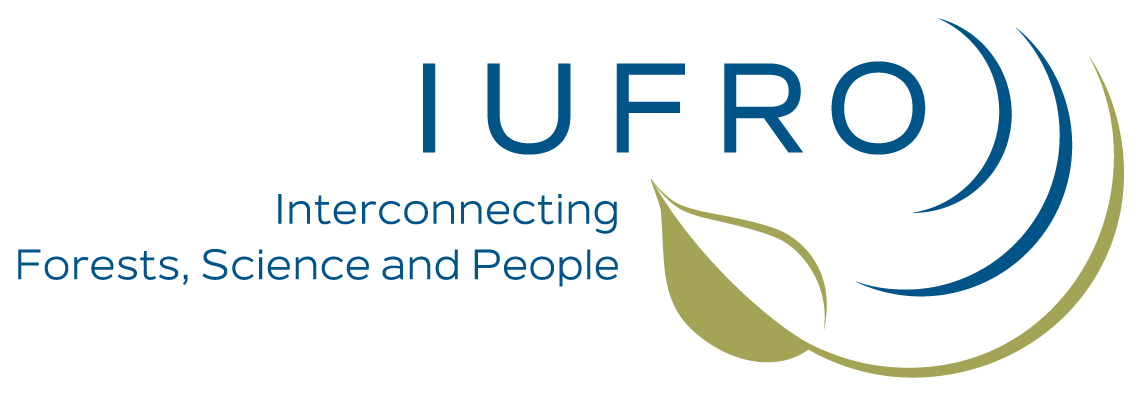
- International Union of Forest Research Organizations
- Abbreviation: IUFRO
- Formation: 1892; 134 years ago
- Type: INGO
- Headquarters: Vienna, Austria
- Region served: Worldwide
- Official language: English, French, German, Spanish
- President: Daniela Kleinschmit (Germany)
- Website: IUFRO Official website

The International Union of Forest Research Organizations (IUFRO) (French: Union Internationale des Instituts de Recherches Forestières, German: Internationaler Verband Forstlicher Forschungsanstalten, Spanish: Unión Internacional de Institutos de Investigación Forestal) is a non-profit, non-governmental international network of forest scientists, headquartered in Austria. In 2019, IUFRO counted 630 Member Organizations worldwide.

== Activities ==
Main activities comprise knowledge generation, knowledge sharing and capacity building.

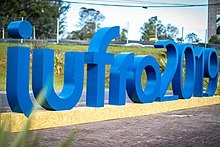
The XXV World Congress in Curitiba, Brazil

=== Congresses and conferences ===
Every five years, IUFRO organizes a World Congress with about 4,000 participants. The most recent was in Stockholm, Sweden in 2024. Between World Congresses, there are some 70-80 smaller conferences, meetings and webinars organized each year by the individual IUFRO research units (i.e. Divisions, Research Groups and Working Parties, Task Forces, Special Programmes, Projects and Chapters) around the world.

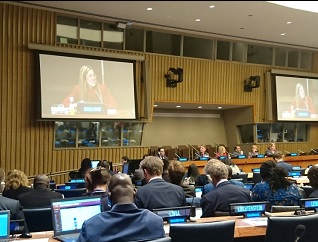
IUFRO presentation at United Nations Forum on Forests (UNFF).

=== Involvement in international processes ===
Many joint activities and partnership agreements occur with national governments, regional and global organizations and NGOs. For example, IUFRO is a Scientific Union Member of the International Council for Science (ICSU), a member of the Collaborative Partnership on Forests (CPF), and an observer organization in the United Nations Forum on Forests, the Convention on Biological Diversity, the UN Framework Convention on Climate Change and other forest-related international processes and conventions. It has established memoranda of understanding with, for instance, the Food and Agriculture Organization of the United Nations (FAO), World Conservation Union (IUCN), the World Wide Fund for Nature (WWF), the International Tropical Timber Organization (ITTO), and International Forestry Students' Association (IFSA).

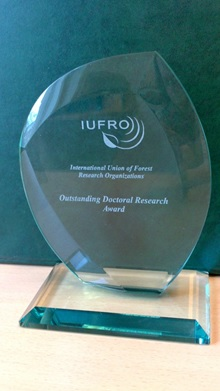
IUFRO ODR Award.

=== Communication and knowledge sharing ===
IUFRO shares scientific knowledge and information with its members and stakeholders via its website iufro.org, the expertise of its officeholders, publications such as IUFRO News, IUFRO Spotlight, calendar of events, webinars, information leaflets, annual reports, occasional papers, IUFRO World Series, IUFRO Research Series, and conference proceedings. In 2011, a Working Party on Communications and Public Relations was established as part of IUFRO Division 9 on Forest Policy and Economics.

=== Honors and awards ===
IUFRO honors through a variety of awards those who advance science and promote international cooperation in all fields of research related to forestry. Awards for scientific work include:

- Scientific Achievement Award (SAA)
- Outstanding Doctoral Research Award (ODRA)
- IUFRO Student Award for Excellence in Forest Science (ISA)
- IUFRO World Congress Host Scientific Award
- Best Poster Award (BPA)

== Organization ==
The Organs of the Union are: Congress; International Council; Board and Committees; Management Committee; President, Prof. Daniela Kleinschmit, and vice-presidents; executive director. The structure of the Union comprises the following IUFRO Units: Divisions with Research Groups and Working Parties; Task Forces, Special Programmes, Projects, IUFRO-led Initiatives and (formerly) Chapters.

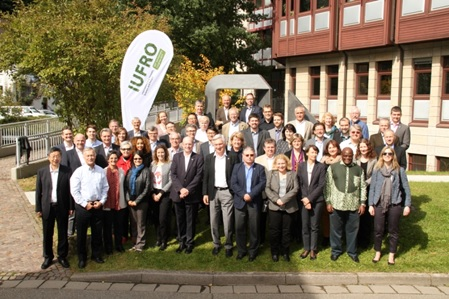
IUFRO Board at the 125th Anniversary Congress in Freiburg, Germany, in 2017.

== History ==
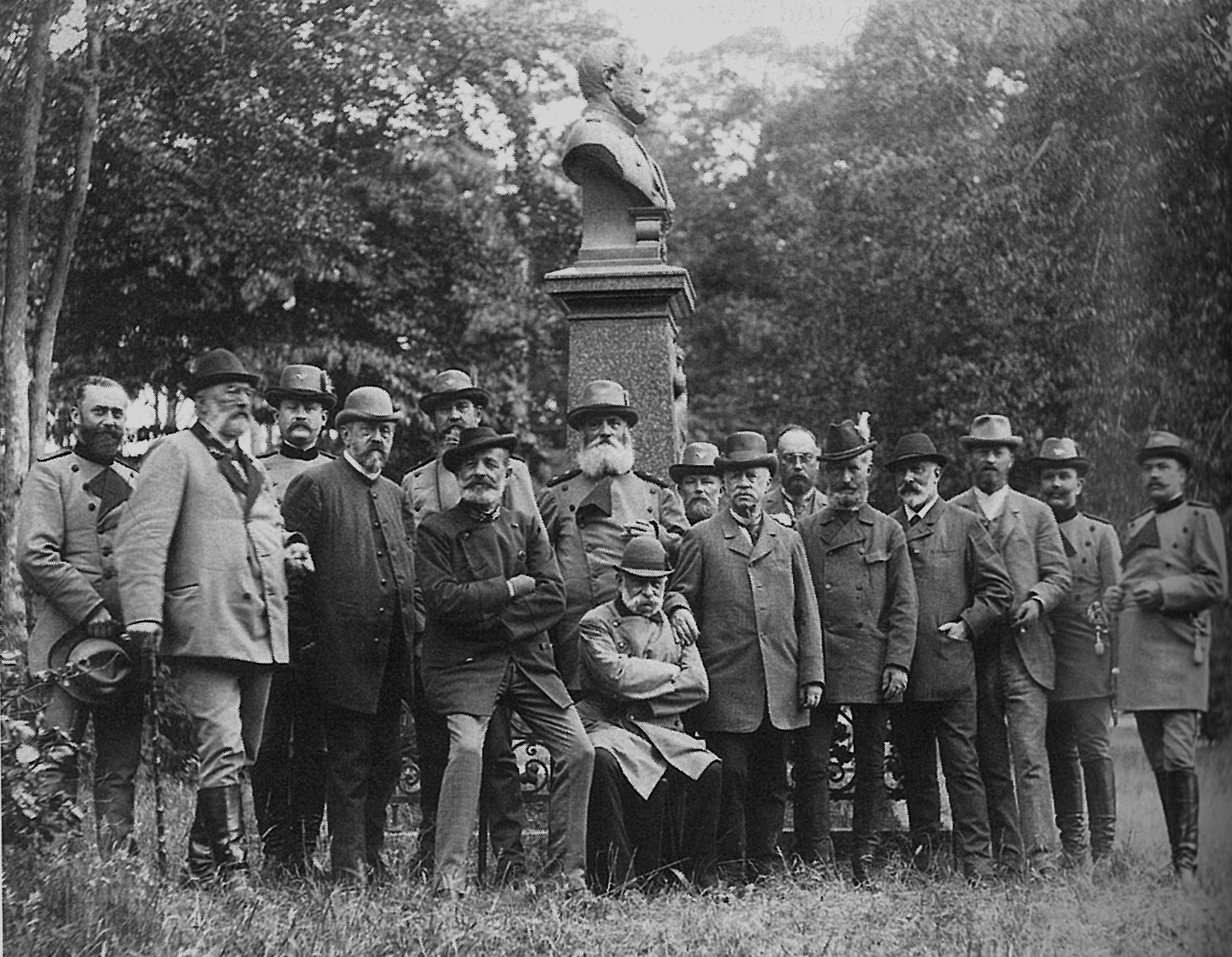
Participants of the 20th Meeting of the German forest research institutes, Eberswalde, Germany, September, 1892. This committee decided on 19 September 1892 the establishment of the International Union of Forest Research Institutes

Forests have always been important for economic development and environmental maintenance. In 1890, the International Agriculture and Forestry Congress in Vienna, Austria, proposed to establish a "central organ" for applied forest research in the European countries. As a consequence, the “International Union of Forest Experiment Organizations” was founded in Eberswalde, Germany, in 1892. Originally, only Austria, Germany and Switzerland agreed that their forest experiment stations would join the Union. By the beginning of World War I, stations from 22 countries, including USA, Canada and Japan, had become members.

During World War I international cooperation stopped, as did forest research in many of the countries involved in the war. The Union only fully resumed its activities in 1929 when the new name “International Union of Forestry Research Organizations” was adopted. In the years to follow, the organization lost its Central European character as more representatives from Africa, Asia and the Americas joined.

World War II reduced the activities of the Union to a minimum. Cooperation continued only between individuals, and not on an institutional basis. In 1949 the newly established Food and Agriculture Organization of the United Nations (FAO) declared its readiness to make available to IUFRO a secretariat at FAO's own Headquarters in Rome.

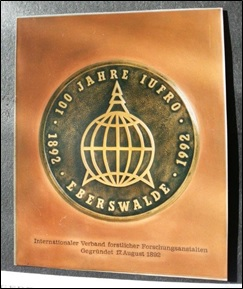
Commemorating 100 years of IUFRO in Eberswalde, Germany, in 1992.

IUFRO has played a role in establishing standards and harmonizing field investigations in forest research. In 1903, the Union initiated international forestry bibliographies that did not exist earlier. Gradually the development led to the well-known Oxford System of Decimal Classification (ODe) for Forestry in the 1950s

The 1950s and 1960s were a period of steady growth. The XV IUFRO World Congress in Gainesville, USA, in 1971 was the first Congress held outside Europe. For the first time, it was referred to as a “World Congress,” and a Congress title was introduced: “The Role of Research in the Intensification of Forestry Practices and Activities.”

In the 1980s, IUFRO started to increasingly address forest-related social, economic, and ecological problems of global importance. The XVIII World Congress held in Ljubljana, Yugoslavia, in 1986 was the first to take place in Eastern Europe.

Since the 1990s the focus of the community of forest policymakers, economists and managers has changed. This is as societal expectations regarding forests broadened to include enhanced production of forest goods, social benefits, and environmental services through sustainable management of trees and forests. IUFRO responded to these challenges by adapting its scientific structure, expanding strategic partnerships and engaging more at the science/policy interface.

The XXI IUFRO World Congress in Kuala Lumpur, Malaysia, in 2000 was the first IUFRO World Congress to be held in a developing country. In 2000 the name of the Union was changed once more into “International Union of Forest Research Organizations”. The year 2000 also marked the first time in IUFRO's history that gender issues were formally addressed. Over the last ten years, IUFRO undertook efforts to expand the scope of work beyond ‘traditional’ sectoral and disciplinary boundaries. At the 125th Anniversary Congress in 2017 in Freiburg, Germany, the slogan “Interconnecting Forests, Science and People” was adopted as part of the logo.

== Presidents ==
- 1892 - 1893 Josef Friedrich
- 1894 - 1896 Bernhard Danckelmann
- 1897 - 1900 Conrad Bourgeois
- 1901 - 1903 Josef Friedrich
- 1904 - 1906 Anton Bühler
- 1907 - 1910 N. I. Crahay
- 1911 - 1914 Jenö Vadas
- 1914 - 1928 None
- 1929 Henrik Hesselman
- 1929 - 1932 Philibert Guinier
- 1933 - 1936 Gyula Roth
- 1937 - 1948 Erich Lönnroth
- 1949 - 1953 Hans Burger
- 1954 - 1956 Aldo Pavari
- 1957 - 1961 James McDonald
- 1962 - 1967 Julius Speer
- 1968 - 1971 George M. Jemison
- 1973 - 1976 Ivar Samset
- 1977 - 1981 Walter Liese
- 1982 - 1986 Dušan Mlinšek
- 1987 - 1990 Robert E. Buckman
- 1991 - 1995 Salleh Mohd Nor
- 1996 - 2000 Jeffery Burley
- 2001 - 2005 Risto Seppälä
- 2006 - 2010 Don Koo Lee
- 2011 - 2014 Niels Elers Koch
- 2014 - 2019 Mike Wingfield
- 2020 - 2024 John Parrotta
- 2024 - 2029 Daniela Kleinschmit

== See also ==
- International Day of Forests
