= European Forest Genetic Resources Programme =

International forest conservation network

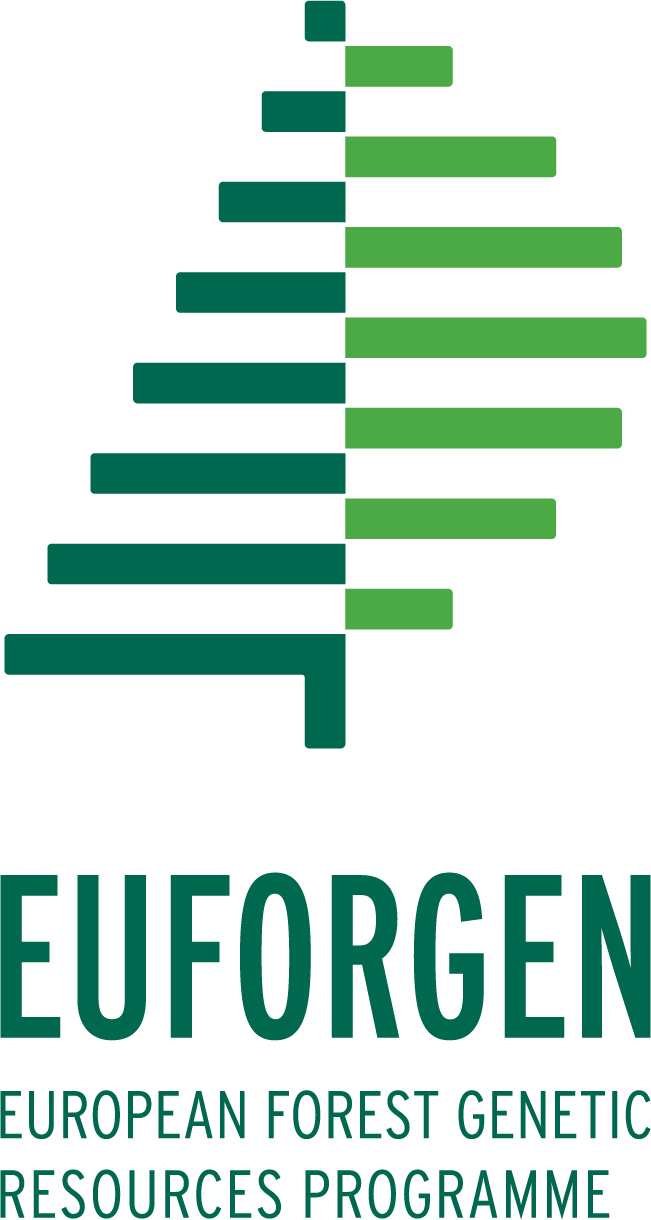
- Formation: 1994
- Purpose: Towards diverse and resilient forests
- Headquarters: Barcelona
- Location: Spain
- Website: www.euforgen.org

European Forest Genetic Resources Programme (EUFORGEN) is an international network that promotes the conservation and sustainable use of forest genetic resources in Europe as an integral part of sustainable forest management. It was established in 1994 as a result of a resolution adopted in 1990 by the first Ministerial Conference of the Forest Europe process.

The programme's tasks include coordination and promotion of in situ and ex situ conservation of forest genetic resources, facilitation of the exchange of information, and increasing public awareness of the need to conserve forest genetic resources.

EUFORGEN is funded by member countries and operates through working groups formed by experts from across Europe who meet to exchange knowledge, analyse policies and practice, and develop science-based strategies to improve the management of forest genetic resources. EUFORGEN was established in 1994. Its secretariat, hosted by the European Forest Institute, is located in Barcelona, Spain.

== Member countries ==
As of June 2023, there are 28 member countries in Europe:

- Austria
- Belgium
- Croatia
- Czech Republic
- Denmark
- Estonia
- Finland
- France
- Germany
- Hungary
- Iceland
- Ireland
- Italy
- Lithuania
- Luxembourg
- Malta
- Netherlands
- Norway
- Poland
- Portugal
- Serbia
- Slovakia
- Slovenia
- Spain
- Sweden
- Switzerland
- Ukraine
- United Kingdom
