= Trempealeau Morninglight =

American skier

Trempealeau Hagios Morninglight (September 14, 2001 – July 22, 2016) was an American skier.

== Life ==
Morninglight was born and died in Taos, New Mexico. He was named after Trempealeau, Wisconsin, where his mother, artist and photographer Heather Lynn Sparrow, grew up. His father Brendan Curran got him into skiing at the young age of four. Morninglight went on to become a big mountain skier.

He joined the Taos Winter Sports Team when he was eight. He raced for two years, then switched to park for about two years. Starting in 2014 he competed in big mountain skiing, or free ride skiing, on the International Free Skiers Association tour. In 2015, he placed 8th overall in North America and placed 4th in the North American Championships held at Grand Targhee Resort.

He participated with a youth organization known as Field Institute of Taos as a camper and later as a stellar youth mentor for many years. In July 2016, Morninglight committed suicide by jumping from the Rio Grande Gorge Bridge near Taos.

== Legacy ==
Since his death, Trempealeau’s mother, Heather Lynn Sparrow, a photographer, shot a series of photographs depicting his friends’ grief. The show The Dark is Light hung at the Atrium Gallery at UNM Taos in November and December 2022 and was featured in Me and Eve.
