= International Forestry Students' Association =

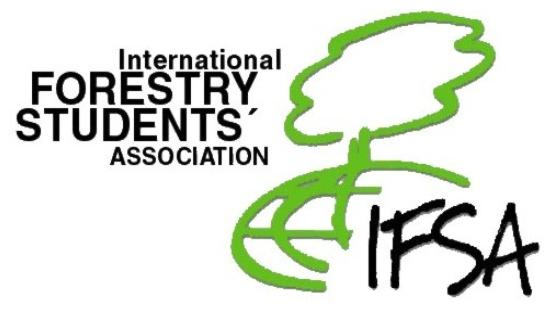
- Abbreviation: IFSA
- Formation: 1973
- Type: Non-profit
- Legal status: Foundation
- Headquarters: Freiburg im Breisgau, Germany
- President: Bashir Isiya Ahmad, Nigeria
- Vice president: Alfarizi Ramadhan, Indonesia
- Executive Secretary: Junwon Bae, Korea
- Treasurer: Helene Eichelhardt, Germany
- Key people: Ivette Estrada (Mexico); Konstantin Schwarz (Germany); Yu-Tung Hung (Taiwan)
- Website: ifsa.net

The International Forestry Students’ Association (IFSA) is an international network of students in forestry-related sciences. It is a globally organized and locally operated student organisation connecting forest and related science students to peers, forest-related organisations, and policy platforms. The IFSA has 130 member associations (known as "local committees") in over 50 countries. IFSA is a non-political, non-profit, and non-religious organisation that is entirely run by students.

IFSA promotes global cooperation among students of forest sciences and provides a voice for youth in international forest policy processes. IFSA provides a platform for students to enrich their formal education, promote cultural understanding by encouraging collaboration with international partners and organisations, and gain practical experiences with a wider and more global perspective. Through its social network, IFSA encourages student meetings, enables participation in scientific debates, and supports the involvement of youth in decision-making processes and international forest and environmental policy.

IFSA is officially registered as a charity organisation, with its seat in Freiburg, Germany.

== History ==
The organisation traces its roots to the International Forestry Students Symposium (IFSS), an annual meeting of forestry students that formed in 1973 in the United Kingdom. The event, which was hosted in the UK for 13 years, aimed to provide forestry students with a platform for meeting their counterparts from other countries, discussing ideas, and creating an atmosphere of solidarity and inspiration. The first accomplishment of these meetings was the creation of INFOCENTRE, an office established to coordinate the exchange of information among forestry students.

During the 18th IFSS in Lisbon, Portugal in 1990, the participants decided to expand the cooperation between forestry students beyond the annual symposium. At the constitutional assembly of IFSA, the founding member associations approved provisional statutes and elected the first representative organs. INFOCENTRE was re-designated as IFSA’s communicative and informational organ.

The following year, the 19th IFSS was organised in the Netherlands with 112 participants from 38 countries, the first time that students from all continents were represented. In the 20th IFSS held in Italy, the third general assembly designated a central organ (the Secretariat), to be responsible for the association’s bureaucratic tasks, internal communications, and all INFOCENTRE duties. The Secretariat thus fully assumed its role as IFSA's headquarters.

IFSA became a worldwide organization when the new statutes were finally approved in 1994 at the fifth general assembly during the 22nd IFSS in Switzerland. The association was officially registered as a charity organization with its seat in Göttingen, Germany. Five years later, with the adoption of the revised statutes, decrees, and by-laws, the general assembly moved the seat to Freiburg in Breisgau, Germany.

== Structure ==
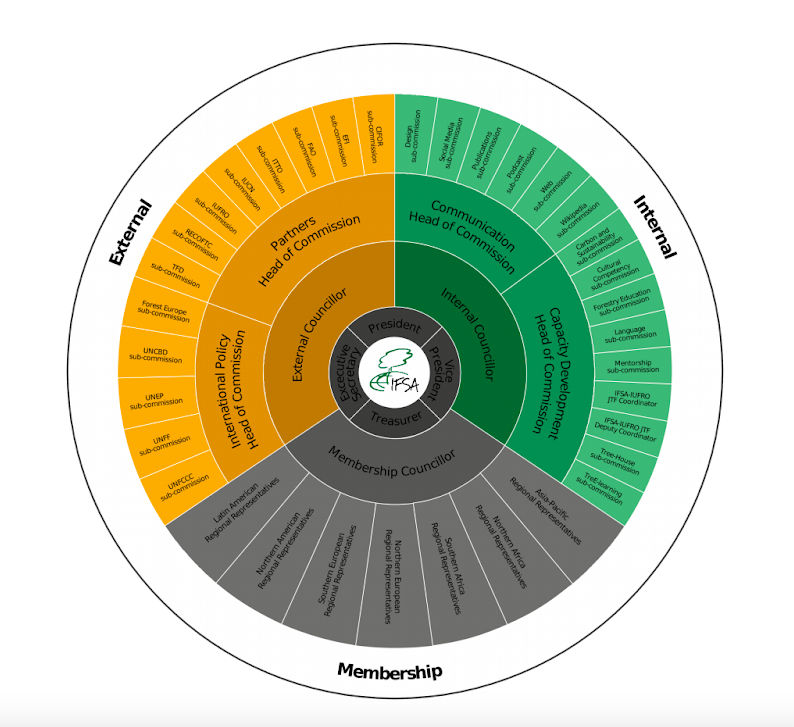
The "IFSA Wheel" which outlines the organization's structure

=== IFSA Board ===
The IFSA Board is composed of seven positions. Those who hold titles are asked to ensure that the organisation is globally represented, inclusive, and growing in a way that is consistent with the organisation's mission, vision, and spirit.

- President
- Vice-President
- Treasurer
- Executive Secretary
- Internal councillor
- External councillor
- Membership councillor

=== IFSA Officials ===
IFSA has various working groups (commissions) that allow students the chance to develop new skills, contribute to the running of the organisation, and work to achieve the aims of IFSA.

==== Internal ====
Communication Commission

- Head of Design Sub-Commission
- Head of Social Media Sub-Commission
- Head of Publication Sub-Commission
- Head of Podcast Sub-Commission
- Head of Web Sub-Commission
- Head of Wikipedia Sub-Commission

Capacity Development Commission

- Head of Carbon and Sustainability Sub-Commission
- Head of Cultural Competency Sub-Commission
- Head of Forestry Education Sub-Commission
- Head of Language Sub-Commission
- Head of Mentorship Sub-Commission
- Head of TreE-Learning Sub-Commission
- Head of Treehouse Sub-Commission
- IFSA-IUFRO Join Task Force Coordinator
- Deputy IFSA-IUFRO Join Task Force Coordinator

==== External ====
Partners Commission

- Head of CIFOR Sub-Commission
- Head of EFI Sub-Commission
- Head of FAO Sub-Commission
- Head of ITTO Sub-Commission
- Head of IUCN Sub-Commission
- Head of IUFRO Sub-Commission
- Head of RECOFTC Sub-Commission
- Head of TDF Sub-Commission

International Policy Commission

- Head of Forest Europe Sub-Commission
- Head of UNCBD Sub-Commission
- Head of UNEP Sub-Commission
- Head of UNFF Sub-Commission
- Head of UNFCCC Sub-Commission

==== Regional representatives ====
Regional Representatives fall within one of seven regions, defined by geographical area. These regions are Asia-Pacific, Northern America, Latin America, Northern Europe, Southern Europe, Northern Africa and Southern Africa.

- Latin America
- Northern America
- Southern Europe
- Northern Europe
- Southern Africa
- Northern Africa
- Asia-Pacific

== Activities ==
=== Youth representation during international decision-making processes regarding environmental and forest policy ===
The organisation promotes the involvement of professional foresters in decision making. The organisation believes that forest scientists are better qualified to evaluate questions of sustainable forest management than specialists from other sciences. Forestry students are offered the opportunity to understand and actively take part in these international forest policy processes.

IFSA holds youth representative status for the following events:

- European Forest Institute Annual Conference
- Food and Agriculture Organization European Forestry Week
- Society of American Foresters National Convention
- United Nations Framework Convention on Climate Change
- IAAS-IFSA Meeting
- International Union of Forest Research Organizations Board Meeting
- FAO World Forestry Congress
- Convention on Biological Diversity Youth Conference
- IUFRO World Congress
- Ministerial Conference on the Protection of Forests in Europe (as focal point organisation)
- United Nations Forum on Forests (as focal point organisation)

=== International forestry students’ meetings ===
IFSA forms a wide network of forestry students throughout the world, on which the association bases its main activities: meetings of students at the regional and international levels.

The International Forestry Students’ Symposium (IFSS) is the venue for the IFSA General Assembly, during which work from the previous year is reported, decisions are made regarding activities and new officials for the next year are elected and appointed. These meetings are hosted by a different country each year. During the IFSS, numerous activities are held to showcase the host country's culture and natural environment, particularly the forests. Events also include lectures from guest speakers and field activities. IFSA hosts regional meetings as well to gather students from the different regions where it is active and discuss specific problems in a geographical area. An interim meeting is held midway through the year and is attended by IFSA officials. Officials discuss their progress and whether they are meeting their aims set at the previous IFSS, discuss any problematic situations and plan avenues for further cooperation.

== Projects ==
=== Tree House ===
Tree House is a project focused on creating a platform for offering and receiving accommodation world-wide for people to exchange culture, experiences and knowledge regarding forestry interests.

=== EFI-IFSA-IUFRO Project ===
The EFI-IFSA-IUFRO project investigates the transforming employment trends in the forest sector while putting special focus on the perspective of students and recent graduates from around the world.

==== Global student survey ====
The Global student survey is a part of the “Global Student Networking and Green Jobs in the Forest sector” a project coordinated by the European Forest Institute (EFI) in collaboration with the International Forestry Students’ Association (IFSA) and the International Union of Forest Research Organisations (IUFRO). The project aims at providing insight into the future labour market including changing professional skills through systematic analysis of the development of employment in the forest sector globally. Global student networking and capacity development of forest students and young scientists are also essential elements of the project.

The aim of the survey is to gain a better understanding of the employment-related ambitions, perception of necessary skills/competencies and satisfaction of forest-related students from around the globe. The results of the survey will be disseminated among educational institutions, lecturers as well as policy makers.

==== Expert workshop on forest sector employment, green jobs, and forest education ====
The aim of the workshop is eliciting overall trends in forest sector employment in different world regions and focus countries, identifying main changes in employment, Gaining insights into forest sector employment, including green jobs and identify employment trends. For the workshop IFSA invited a senior and junior expert from each of the following 6 selected focus countries: Brazil, Finland, Germany, Indonesia, South Africa and the United States of America.

==== Dare to Explore! – Traineeship Program ====
The Dare to Explore! Traineeship Program has offered four specified, 3-month traineeship opportunities each year from 2019 to 2021. The trainee positions are intended to familiarize students of forestry programs with work at the science-policy-interface at the international level, including research, communication, and policy-relevant activities.

=== IFSA-IUFRO Africa Book Project ===
The project’s overall goal is to motivate and inspire young people to pursue forest-related studies and careers in Africa by increasing the visibility of career options and young African role models working in forest-related fields.

== Partnerships ==
IFSA's primary community focuses on students of forestry and related sciences, but this stretches to include youth associations in other disciplines (such as agriculture, water, geography) and numerous professional organizations. Notable organisation partners include:

- Food and Agriculture Organization
- European Forest Institute
- Center for International Forestry Research
- Ministerial Conference on the Protection of Forests in Europe
- Global Peatlands Initiative
- International Tropical Timber Organization
- International Union for Conservation of Nature
- International Union of Forest Research Organizations
- RECOFTC
- The Forests Dialogue
- Convention on Biological Diversity
- United Nations Environment Programme
- United Nations Framework Convention on Climate Change
- United Nations Forum on Forests
- Youth in Landscapes Initiative
