= Sustainable Forestry Initiative =

North American forest certification standard

Sustainable Forestry Initiative (SFI)
- Founded: 1995
- Type: Sustainability
- Purpose: Sustainable forestry
- Method: Certification
- Website: forests.org

The Sustainable Forestry Initiative (SFI) is a sustainability organization operating in the United States and Canada. SFI was founded in 1994 by the American Forest & Paper Association (AF&PA), a wood and paper products trade association. SFI is the world's largest single forest certification standard by area. SFI is headquartered in Ottawa and Washington, D.C.

== SFI standards ==
The SFI 2022 Forest Management Standard covers key values such as protection of biodiversity, species at risk and wildlife habitat; sustainable harvest levels; protection of water quality; and prompt regeneration. SFI has certified more than 370 million acres (150 million hectares) to its standard in the United States and Canada.

The SFI 2022 Fiber Sourcing Standard promotes responsible forestry practices based on 13 Principles, 11 Objectives, 29 Performance Measures and 59 Indicators that address the 90 percent of the world's forests that are not certified. The SFI 2022 Fiber Sourcing Standard sets practice requirements for the responsible procurement of fiber if it is sourced from non-certified land.

The SFI 2022 Chain-of-Custody Standard is an accounting system that tracks forest fiber content (certified forest content, certified sourcing and recycled content) through production and manufacturing to the end product.

All SFI certifications require independent, third-party audits and are performed by internationally accredited certification bodies.

The new set of SFI 2022 Standards and Rules, developed through an open review process, took effect on Jan. 1, 2022. The SFI 2022 Standards and Rules include new requirements in a number of areas. The SFI Climate Smart Forestry Objective requires SFI-certified organizations to ensure forest management activities address climate change adaptation and mitigation measures. The SFI Fire Resilience and Awareness Objective requires SFI-certified organizations to limit susceptibility of forests to undesirable impacts of wildfire and to raise community awareness of fire benefits, risks, and minimization measures. The new Objective 8, Recognize and Respect Indigenous Peoples’ Rights, ensures respect for Indigenous Peoples’ rights and traditional knowledge, and are aligned with the principles of the United Nations Declaration on the Rights of Indigenous Peoples.

The SFI standards are revised and updated regularly to incorporate the latest scientific information and to ensure continual improvement. Draft SFI standards were publicly available throughout the revision process on the SFI website. Input was received during 10 public webinars. SFI gathered input from more than 2,300 stakeholders from the conservation community, Indigenous communities, the forest products sector, brand owners, private forest landowners and public forest managers, government agencies, trade associations, landowner associations, academia, and the public.

Independent oversight was provided at each stage of the revision process by the SFI External Review Panel, a group of independent experts representing conservation, professional, academic and public organizations, operating at arm's length from SFI. The SFI External Review Panel reviewed every public comment submitted to ensure that all comments were considered, and to guarantee the Standard revision process was transparent, objective and credible. The responses to comments are posted on the SFI website.

SFI standards only apply to forestlands in the United States and Canada, and SFI-certified organizations must comply with all applicable laws. For sources outside of North America without effective laws, participants must avoid illegal or other controversial sources. SFI supports activities by international experts to find ways to address the problem of illegal logging and is a member of the international, multi-stakeholder Forest Legality Alliance.

SFI sponsored a world record attempt for tree planting. During this attempt in May 2015, 29 teams came together to plant 202,935 trees in one hour across North America. The teams included youth, community groups and industry partners.

== SFI Board of Directors ==
The Board of Directors that governs SFI has three chambers are divided into environmental, economic, and social sectors.

The current board of directors features environmental representatives, including Dr. Tracey Farrell, CEO of the International Union for Conservation of Nature and Catherine Grenier, President and CEO of The Nature Conservancy (Canada ). Members drawn from the North American forestry sector include Michael P. Doss, President and CEO of Graphic Packaging and Don Kayne, the CEO of Canfor. Additional members of the board come from social action groups, Indigenous organizations, government, professional associations of foresters, and other non-profits.

== Research publications ==
SFI-certified organizations must support forest research as a condition of their certification. SFI science and conservation staff contribute directly to research papers about SFI supported research. Since 1995, $1.9 billion has been invested in forest research through SFI and its network.

- PLOS Climate (June 2023) Climate-Smart Forestry: Promise and risks for forests, society, and climate
- International Journal of Forest Engineering (Dec. 2022) Access feature areas within clearcut harvests by region across the southeastern US
- Forest Ecology and Management (Sep. 2022) Increased levels of forestry best management practices reduce sediment delivery from Piedmont and Upper Coastal Plain clearcut harvests and access features, southeastern states, USA
- The Forestry Source (July 2022) At Issue is Deforestation “Right Here in River City”
- Forest Science (March 2022) Estimated Erosion from Clearcut Timber Harvests in the Southeastern United States
- Business Strategy and the Environment (May 2021) Using technology to improve the management of development impacts on biodiversity
- Forests (Jan. 2021) Non-Native Earthworms Invade Forest Soils in Northern Maine, USA
- Forest, Range and Wildland Soils (July 2020) Influence of mechanized timber harvesting on soil compaction in northern hardwood forests

== Media references ==
"Flames of opportunity: How fire shapes the future of our forests," Canadian Forest Industries Magazine. Communities across North America are grappling with more frequent and destructive wildfires. In this article, Lauren Cooper, SFI's Chief Conservation Officer, writes how it can be difficult to see through the smoke and understand that sometimes fire can be beneficial.

“Outdoor classrooms reenergize kids during the pandemic,” CNN. This cable news story featured educators using educational materials from Project Learning Tree, SFI’s environmental education program.

“Opaskwayak Cree Nation student plans virtual ice fishing derby,” CBC. This news story featured Project Learning Tree Canada’s Green Leaders program, which encourages Indigenous youth to plan and deliver community-based projects. PLT Canada is supported in part by the Government of Canada and is delivered by the SFI and Canadian Parks Council networks.

“Forging a Career Path in the Forest Sector,” Alternatives Journal, Canada’s oldest environmental studies magazine.

“Help Protect North American Wildlife With Bird-Friendly Construction Design,” Construction Executive. SFI and the American Bird Conservancy collaborated on this an op-ed to highlight the importance of their collaborative efforts to allow SFI-certified organizations to access the latest information on bird habitat and conservation needs, which can be used to improve sustainable forest management.

== Reviews and comparisons ==
While some sources consider SFI to be less rigorous than other forest sustainability organizations, other sources consider them to be equally valid.

=== Third-party reviews ===
The United Nations Economic Commission for Europe/Food and Agriculture Organization, in its 2009–2010 Forest products Annual Review, says: "Over the years, many of the issues that previously divided the (certification) systems have become much less distinct. The largest certification systems now generally have the same structural programmatic requirements."

Dovetail Partners Inc., in its 2010 Forest Certification: A Status Report, states: "the previous differences between forest certification programs are much less distinct ... each program generally has the same structural programmatic requirements, although the required content and level of detail provided by each may vary considerably."

SFI is considered less stringent by some people than the Forest Stewardship Council (FSC). In 2009, the New York Times described the FSC as the "premier judge of whether a wood of paper product should be labeled as environmentally friendly." For example, SFI allows more tree farming and does not require conservation plans or consultation with local and indigenous stakeholders (except for public lands).

SFI was less highly rated than FSC by Consumer Reports “Greener Choices”, and Green America. Others rate SFI/PEFC and FSC equally: TerraChoice (part of Underwriters Laboratories Global Network) in its 2010 Sins of Greenwashing report, like its 2009 one, counts the SFI/PEFC and FSC in its second-tier list of "legitimate" environmental standards and certifications.; as does Environment Canada's EcoLogo.

A National Association of State Foresters forest certification policy statement passed by resolution in 2008 states: "While in different manners, the ATFS (American Tree Farm System), FSC (Forest Stewardship Council), and SFI systems include the fundamental elements of credibility and make positive contributions to forest sustainability. No certification program can credibly claim to be ‘best’, and no certification program that promotes itself as the only certification option can maintain credibility."

In 2005, the Programme for the Endorsement of Forest Certification endorsed the SFI certification system.

=== Green Building Council ===
The U.S. Green Building Council Leadership in Energy and Environmental Design (LEED) recognized sustainably sourced wood, certified by SFI, the Forest Stewardship Council, or the Programme for the Endorsement of Forest Certification to count towards LEED v5 points. This is a change from LEED v4, which was introduced in 2013 recognized the Forest Stewardship council but did not recognize SFI.

Other green building tools, including two American National Standards Institute (ANSI)-approved rating systems in the United States – ANSI-ICC 700–2008: National Green Building Standard and ANSI/GBI 01-2010: Green Building Assessment Protocol for Commercial Buildings (formerly Green Globes U.S.) – Green Globes and Built Green Canada recognize wood products certified by credible third-party certification programs like SFI.

=== Conservation organizations ===
As of 2021, the conservation groups Arbor Day Foundation and Nature Conservancy Canada serve on the SFI Board. In 2012, a World Wide Fund for Nature (WWF) representative served on the FSC Board. In 2013, the Sierra Club endorsed only FSC, but as of 2025 they actively oppose them.

== Criticism ==
=== Marketing practices ===
On September 9, 2009 the Washington State Forest Law Center, on behalf of the environmental protection group ForestEthics, filed complaints against SFI Inc. with the Federal Trade Commission and the Internal Revenue Service. The FTC complaint accused SFI Inc. of misleading consumers with deceptive marketing practices. The complaint cited various aspects of SFI's marketing, including its claim that it is an “independent” not-for-profit organization, its dependence on the timber industry for funding, and the vagueness of SFI's environmental standards, which allow SFI-certified landowners to be certified merely because the landowner is complying with state environmental regulations. In response SFI ally, the Coalition for Fair Forest Certification, filed a counter-complaint with FTC against the Forest Stewardship Council, arguing that it was similarly flawed and actively sought to exclude SFI certified companies from LEED certification. No action resulted.

In April 2013, SFI sent a cease and desist letter to ForestEthics regarding their criticisms and threatened to sue. In June 2013, ForestEthics partnered with Greenpeace to file another complaint with the FTC, alleging that SFI was violating the FTC's standards by claiming that the products they certify were "green." They further alleged that this was due to SFI's close connection to timber companies. SFI responded to the accusation by suggesting that the complaint was part of an effort to bias companies towards the Forest Stewardship Council instead.

In late 2022, several environmental organizations in Canada filled a complaint with the Canadian Competition Bureau that the SFI was engaged in misleading advertising practices by falsely claiming that it's certifications did not promote sustainable forestry. They accused the SFI of greenwashing. In February 2023, the Canadian Competition Bureau launched a probe to investigate.

=== Non-profit status ===
The complaint filed with the IRS requested an examination of SFI Inc.’s non-profit status, based on the argument that SFI benefits the private interests of its corporate landowners and not the public interest, as well as the fact that SFI draws funding from the wood and paper industry. The complaint asserts that in serving the private interests of wood and paper companies that want a "green" image, SFI is inappropriately granted a nonprofit status reserved for public charities.

=== Certification of illegal and unsustainable companies ===
In 2006, the Seattle Audubon Society called for SFI to revoke Weyerhaeuser's certification until they pledged to uphold SFI standards due to Weyerhaeuser logging practices that harmed the habitat of four endangered Northern spotted owls. At the same time, the Natural Resources Council of Maine lodged a similar complaint against Plum Creek Timber for violating Maine forestry laws. The SFI responded that they would investigate these complaints.

In 2009, the Sierra Club lodged a formal complaint with SFI, alleging that Weyerhaeuser engaged in risky and irresponsible logging on steep slopes that led to 1,259 landslides in 2007 on SFI-certified Weyerhaeuser lands in Washington state. Challenging SFI to back up its claims of independence and "rigorous audits," the Sierra Club requested that Weyerhaeuser's SFI certification be revoked.

In 2014, the Center for Sustainable Economy filed a formal complaint with SFI for providing a seal of approval to a company that does not meet SFI standards. The Center for Sustainable Economy asked SFI to suspend certification Plum Creek Timberland given their repeated illegal logging operations and Bureau Veritas Certification North America Inc, the company that audited the company for eligibility.

== See also ==
- Certified wood
- Sustainable forest management
