= Certified wood =

Wood product from a responsibly managed forest

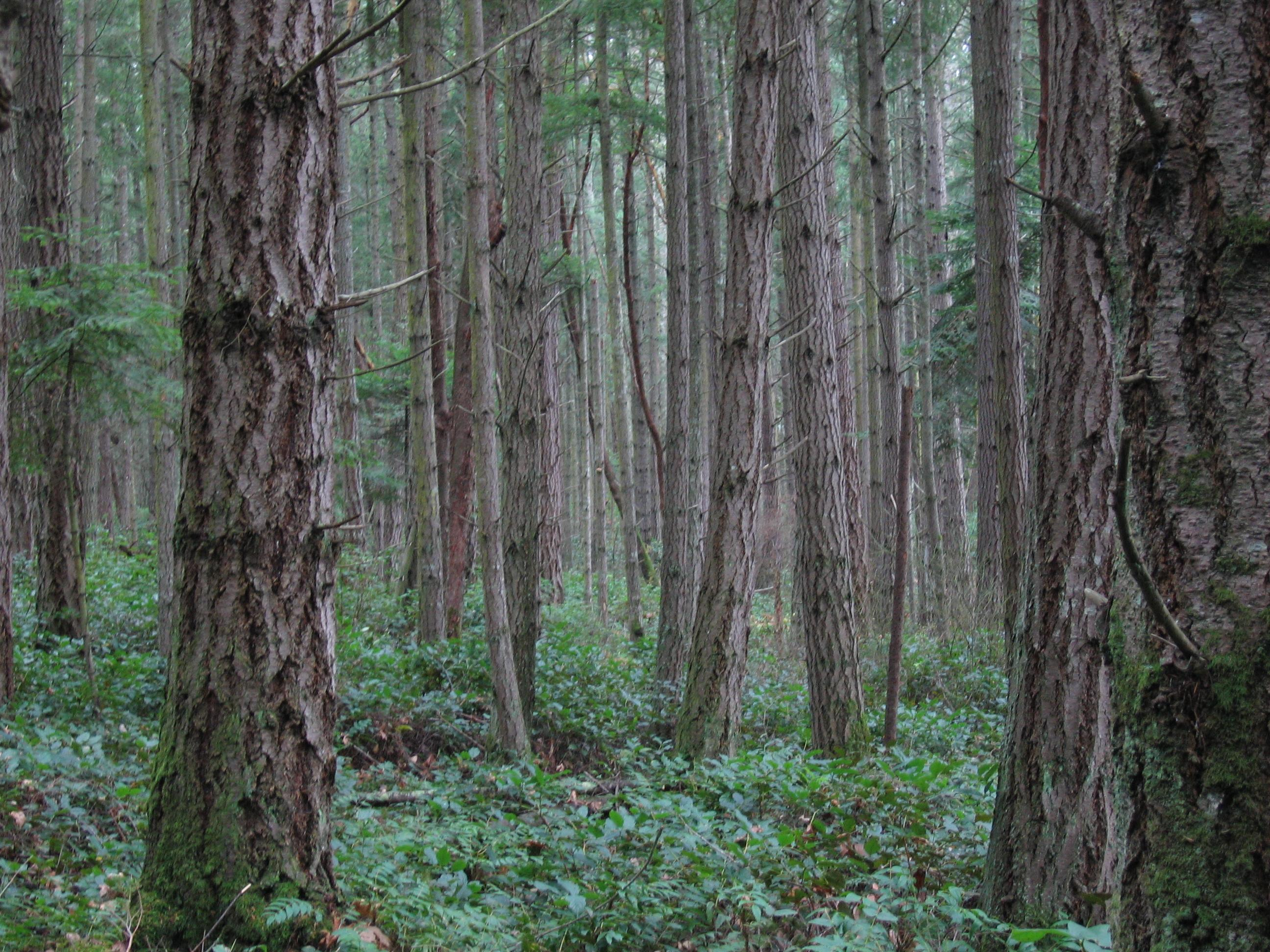
A managed forest on San Juan Island in Washington

Certified wood and paper products come from responsibly managed forests – as defined by a particular standard. With third-party forest certification, an independent standards setting organization (SSO) develops standards for good forest management, and independent auditing companies issue certificates to forest operations that comply with those standards.

== Requirements ==
Forest certification programs typically require that forest management practices conform to existing laws. Other basic requirements or characteristics of forest certification programs include:

Basic requirements of credible forest certification programs include:

- Protection of biodiversity, species at risk and wildlife habitat; sustainable harvest levels; protection of water quality; and prompt regeneration (e.g., replanting and reforestation).
- Third-party certification audits performed by accredited certification bodies.
- Publicly available certification audit summaries.
- Multi-stakeholder involvement in a standards setting development process.
- Complaints and appeals process.

== Programs ==
ISO members rejected a proposal for a forestry management system as requirements standard, with a consensus that a management system for certification would not be effective. Instead ISO members voted for a chain of custody of wood and wood-based products with ISO 38200 published in 2018. Without a single international standard for forestry management certification, there are a proliferation of private standards, with more than 50 scheme owners offering certification programs worldwide addressing the many types of forests and tenures around the world. The two largest international forest certification programs are the Forest Stewardship Council (FSC) and the Programme for the Endorsement of Forest Certification (PEFC). The Forest Stewardship Council's Policy on Conversion states that land areas converted from natural forests to round wood production after November 1994 are ineligible for Forest Stewardship Council certification.

The PEFC is the largest certification framework in terms of forest area, with approximately two-thirds of the total certified area. The FSC program is the fastest growing. In 2021, PEFC issued a position statement defending their use of private standards in response to the Destruction: Certified report from Greenpeace.

Third-party forest certification was pioneered in the early 1990s by the FSC, a collaboration between environmental NGOs, forest product companies and social interests. Competing systems quickly emerged throughout the world. Some commentators, including Jared Diamond, have suggested that many competing private standards were set up by logging companies specifically aiming to confuse consumers with less rigorously enforced but similarly named competing standards.

There are two varieties of forest certification:

1. forest management certification, which determines if forests are maintained in accordance with a set of criteria;
2. chain of custody certification, which ensures that certified material is identified or kept separate from non-certified or non-controlled material throughout the manufacturing process and is traceable from the forest to the ultimate customer.

=== United States and Canada ===
In the United States and Canada, there are a number of forest certification programs. Three of these programs are endorsed by the PEFC. They are the American Tree Farm System (ATFS), the Canadian Standards Association's Sustainable Forest Management (SFM) Standard and the Sustainable Forestry Initiative (SFI). ATFS is applicable only in the United States; the Canadian Standards Association SFM Standard is applicable only in Canada. SFI is applicable to both the United States and Canada. SFI is the world's largest single forest certification standard by area. The FSC, program is applied throughout North America.

The National Association of State Foresters in the USA passed a resolution in 2008 that supports all of the forest certification systems used in the USA and recognized the value of their differences: "... the ATFS, FSC, and SFI systems include the fundamental elements of credibility and make positive contributions to forest sustainability.... No certification program can credibly claim to be ‘best’, and no certification program that promotes itself as the only certification option can maintain credibility. Forest ecosystems are complex and a simplistic ‘one size fits all’ approach to certification cannot address all sustainability needs.".

The Canadian Council of Forest Ministers issued a statement in 2008 on forest certification standards in Canada, which said: "In Canada, each jurisdiction's forest laws, policies and administrative requirements comprise an over-arching framework that fully characterizes what sustainable forest management (SFM) means in that jurisdiction, and what actions may take place on public and/or private forest land. Governments in Canada support third-party forest certification as a tool to demonstrate the rigor of Canada's forest management laws, and to document the country's world-class sustainable forest management record. The forest management standards of the Canadian Standards Association (CSA), the FSC and SFI are all used in Canada. Governments in Canada accept that these standards demonstrate, and promote the sustainability of forest management practices in Canada."

== Chain-of-custody certification ==
Chain of custody certification tracks the certified material through the production process – from the forest to the consumer, including all successive stages of processing, transformation, manufacturing and distribution. It also provides evidence that certified material in a certified product originates from certified forests.

The United Nations reports that between January 2009 and May 2010, the total number of PEFC and FSC chain-of-custody certificates issued worldwide increased by 88% for a total of 23,717 certificates (this does not include SFI certificates). There are over 600 organizations certified to the SFI Chain-of-Custody Standard, and SFI-certified products are sold in more than 120 countries around the world.

== Future expansion ==
Forest certification is a voluntary process. About 10% of the world's forest under at least one certification program. Customers that choose to buy certified products are supporting land managers, land owners and forest product companies that have made a commitment to meeting the standards of forest certification.

Third-party forest certification is a useful tool for those seeking to purchase paper and wood products that come from forests that are well-managed and use materials that are legally harvested. Incorporating third-party certification into forest product buying practices can be a centerpiece for responsible wood and paper purchasing policies that include factors such as the protection of sensitive forest values, thoughtful material selection and efficient use of products.

The 2009-2010 United Nations Market Review reported that companies that produced or traded in certified forest products often had a market advantage during the 2008-2009 recession because, in a buyers’ market, buyers could be more selective in choosing their sources of supply. The report cites four demand drivers for certification:

- Paper, publishing, printing and packaging – commitments to increase the use of responsible paper sources by large publishers such as Time Inc. has probably been the most significant factor driving growth in forest and chain-of-custody certification.
- Green public procurement – governments such as the UK and the Netherlands have adopted green timber procurement policies, including recognition of FSC and PEFC endorsed programs. An example is the UK's Central Point of Expertise on Timber (set up by the Department of Environment, Food and Rural Affairs and operated by ProForest).
- Green building – standards for green building incentivize and reward the use of certified wood products.
- Illegal logging – new legislation designed to minimize the risk of illegal wood entering supply chains such as the amended Lacey Act in the United States has created a strong incentive to demand independently certified wood that can address illegal logging concerns.

The World Resources Institute, in partnership with the Environmental Investigation Agency, released a fact sheet designed to answer some of the frequently asked questions about the Lacey Act, which was amended in 2008 to ban commerce in illegally sourced plants and their products—including timber, wood, and paper products. The fact sheet says forest certification is a very good approach for demonstrating due care by showing government and customers that a company has taken proactive steps to eliminate illegal wood or plant material from its supply chain. Certification does not relieve importers of the requirement to submit appropriate import declaration information to U.S. government agencies.

== See also ==
- Ecolabel
- Environmental audits
- Forest protection
- Green building
- Greenguard Environmental Institute
- Illegal logging
- Programme for the Endorsement of Forest Certification
- Sustainable forest management
- Sustainable management
- Wood management
- Wood laundering
