= Forest Principles =

The Forest Principles (also Rio Forest Principles, formally the Non-Legally Binding Authoritative Statement of Principles for a Global Consensus on the Management, Conservation and Sustainable Development of All Types of Forests) is a 1992 document produced at the United Nations Conference on Environment and Development (the "Earth Summit"). It is a non-legally binding document that makes several recommendations for conservation and sustainable development forestry.

At the Earth Summit, the negotiation of the document was complicated by demands by developing nations in the Group of 77 for increased foreign aid in order to pay for the setting aside of forest reserves. Developed nations resisted those demands, and the final document was a compromise.

== Development ==
The FOREST EUROPE process (Ministerial Conference on the Protection of Forests in Europe, MCPFE) was started by Strasbourg Conference in 1990 and the Forest Principles were adopted and incorporated into the agenda by Helsinki Conference in 1993. The process covers Pan-European region consisting of 47 signatories (46 European countries and the European Union) that partially overlaps with Montréal Process region (Russia is a signatory of both processes).

As a result of lobbying by the developing country caucus (or Group of 77) in the United Nations, the non-legally binding Forest Principles were established in 1992. These linked the problem of deforestation to third world debt and inadequate technology transfer and stated that the "agreed full incremental cost of achieving benefits associated with forest conservation...should be equitably shared by the international community" (para1(b)). Subsequently, the Group of 77 argued in the 1995 Intergovernmental Panel on Forests (IPF) and then the 2001 Intergovernmental Forum on Forests (IFF), for affordable access to environmentally sound technologies without the stringency of intellectual property rights; while developed states there rejected demands for a forests fund.

The expert group created under the United Nations Forum on Forests (UNFF) reported in 2004, but in 2007 developed nations again vetoed language in the principles of the final text which might confirm their legal responsibility under international law to supply finance and environmentally sound technologies to the developing world.

The Montréal Process, also known as the Working Group on Criteria and Indicators for the Conservation and Sustainable Management of Temperate and Boreal Forests, was started in 1994 as a result of the Forest Principles.

== See also ==
- Ecology
- Forest ecology
- Land use, land-use change, and forestry (LULUCF)
- United Nations Forum on Forests
