= International Free Skiers Association =

Sports organization

International Freeskier & Snowboarder Association
- Abbreviation: IFSA
- Formation: 1996
- Founders: Shane McConkey
- Type: Nonprofit
- Purpose: sanction junior and adult big mountain freeride competitions
- Location: Salt Lake City, Utah
- Region served: North America, South America
- Executive Director: Brennan Metzler
- Website: ifsafreeride.org
- Formerly called: International Freeskiers Association

The International Freeskier & Snowboarder Association (IFSA) was established in 1996 – as the "International Freeskiers Association" – by renowned freeskiers Shane McConkey, Lhotse Hawk, and a number of industry athletes and organizers.

Today the 501(c)(3) nonprofit organization is located in Salt Lake City, Utah. The IFSA organizes or sanctions big mountain freeride competitions for adult and junior (under 19 years of age) participants in the US, Canada, Argentina and Chile.

The 2024 Junior Freeride Championships were held April 7-14 at Breckenridge, Colorado.
