= Montréal Process =

International agreement on sustainable forest management

The Montréal Process, officially known as the Montréal Process Working Group on Criteria and Indicators for the Conservation and Sustainable Management of Temperate and Boreal Forests, is a voluntary agreement on sustainable forest management. It was formed in Geneva, Switzerland in June 1994 as a result of the Rio Forest Principles developed at the 1992 Earth Summit.

== Background ==
The Montréal Process was formed in June 1994 as a direct response to the Rio Forest Principles, a document that was created at the United Nations Conference on Environment and Development suggesting recommendations for sustainable management of forests (The Montréal Process, 2015, p. 8). One of the first orders of business for the Montréal Process Working Group was to create and implement criteria and indicators for the conservation and sustainable management of forests (Montréal Process, 2014, para. 1).

In February 1995, countries in the Montréal Process adopted the Santiago Declaration which confirmed their commitment to the conservation and sustainable management of forests. They completed their first order of business by endorsing seven criteria and sixty-seven associated indicators as guidelines for policy makers to refer to in determining national forest trends and advancing toward a more sustainable forest management (The Montréal Process, 2015, p. 8).

In 2003, the Montréal Process countries created and published their first country reports which were highlighted in the Montréal Process First Forest Overview Report 2003. They also adopted the Québec City Declaration in September 2003 which set a vision for the Montréal Process for the timeframe from 2003 until 2008 (The Montréal Process, 2015, p. 8).

In November 2007, the member countries revised the first six criteria in Buenos Aires and used these improvements to prepare the second country reports in 2009 once again showing their commitment for the sustainable management of forests (The Montréal Process, 2015, p. 8). In addition to this, they also established the framework for the Montréal Process Strategic Action Plan: 2009-2015 which serves as the overall guiding document for the Montréal Process and helps in efforts of communicating with the international community the Montréal Process's objectives and priorities (The Montréal Process, 2015, p. 9).

In 2009, the Montréal Process countries revised the seventh criteria in South Korea and trimmed the criteria and indicators to seven criteria and fifty-four indicators (The Montréal Process, 2015, p. 9).

Although there has been many successful initiatives, there is still considerable room for improvement of the country reporting practices. Chandran and Innes, researchers at the Department of Forest Resources Management, University of British Columbia, stated “current reporting practices, if not corrected, will create difficulties in communicating progress in sustainable forest management amongst countries” (Chandran, 2014, p. 103).

== Member countries ==
Becoming a member of the Working Group is completely voluntary and members currently includes countries from both the northern and southern hemisphere that cover a vast array of natural and social conditions (The Montreal Process, 2015, para. 3). Currently there are twelve members of the Montréal Process and those countries are: Argentina, Australia, Canada, Chile, China, Japan, South Korea, Mexico, New Zealand, Russia, United States and Uruguay (The Montréal Process, 2015, p. 5).

These member countries account for: (The Montréal Process, 2015, p. 5).

- 90% of the temperate and boreal forests (as well as areas of tropical forests)
- 58% of planted forests
- 49% of the world's forests
- 49% of the world's roundwood production
- 31% of the world's population

== Criteria and indicators ==
The main goal of sustainable forest management is to maintain a broad, specified range of forest values for an indefinite period of time. It is extremely difficult to assess progress towards the goal, therefore, criteria and indicators are used to make the mission understandable by simplifying the essential components of sustainable forest management by providing a common understanding, as well as a universal framework for describing each individual country's progress towards sustainability at a national level (The Montreal Process, 2015, para. 4).

The member countries of the Montréal Process agreed upon initially seven criteria and sixty-seven associated indicators before trimming it down to seven criteria and fifty-four indicators. The Montréal Process Working Group settled on these criteria and indicators after consulting with various professionals such as forest managers and users, researchers, private industry, technical and policy experts from non-member countries, and the international scientific community (The Montréal Process, 2015, p. 8).

The seven criteria the member countries agreed to are: Conservation of biological diversity, Maintenance of productive capacity of forest ecosystems, Maintenance of forest ecosystem health and vitality, Conservation and maintenance of soil and water resources, Maintenance of forest contribution to global carbon cycles, Maintenance and enhancement of long-term multiple socio-economic benefits to meet the needs of societies, Legal, institutional and economic framework for forest conservation and sustainable management. (The Montréal Process, 2015, p. 8)

== Strategic action plan ==
The Montréal Process Strategic Action Plan is the definitive guiding document for the Montréal Process Working Group. It is also an extremely useful tool in communicating the Montréal Process's objectives and priorities to member countries, domestic stakeholders and the international community (The Montréal Process, 2015, p. 9).

The Montréal Process Strategic Action Plan: 2009-2015 is based on the five strategic directions: Enhance the relevance of the Montréal Process criteria and indicators for policymakers, practitioners and others; Strengthen member country capacity to monitor, assess and report on forest trends and progress toward sustainable forest management using the Montréal Process criteria and indicators; Enhance collaboration and cooperation with forest related regional and international organizations and instruments and other criteria and indicator processes; Enhance communication on the value of criteria and indicators and the accomplishments of the Montréal Process; Enhance the effectiveness and efficiency of the Montréal Process Working Group and its Technical Advisory Committee and Liaison Office (The Montréal Process, 2015, p. 9).

== Impact ==
The Montréal Process's criteria and indicators is “a prima facie example of sectoral capture of a normative process” that were agreed to remarkably quick for an intergovernmental agreement, unlike what occurred at the United Nations Conference on Environment and Development where efforts in creating a legally-binding forest management agreement was met with constant rejection and failure (Gale, 2014, p. 174). The sustainable management of forests idea that emerged from the Montréal Process has been highly influential on future sustainable forest management ideas with many forest agreements that were signed after the United Nations Conference on Environment and Development referencing the criteria and indicator processes from the Montréal Process when referring to sustainable management of forests, including, the Non-Legally Binding Instrument on All Types of Forests agreed in 2007 at the United Nations Forum on Forests (Gale, 2014, p. 171). Some other processes the Montréal Process has influenced is the Helsinki Process, which developed criteria and indicator for European temperate and boreal forests, and the Tarapoto Process, which developed criteria and indicator for countries managing tropical forests in Amazonia (Gale, 2014, p. 174). The Montréal Process has helped member countries in improving their sustainable management of forestry by examining the country's current needs in the present and in the future allowing them to provide economic, social, and environmental benefits for future generations. Countries such as New Zealand have seen a 50% increase in the volume of sustainable harvesting, an increase in the standing volume of plantation forests, and an increased focus on the health and safety of workers in the forestry industry (Montreal Process, 2016, para. 10).

== See also ==
- Deforestation by country
