= United Nations Forum on Forests =

Intergovernmental policy forum

- Abbreviation: UNFF
- Formation: 18 October 2000; 24 years ago
- Type: Intergovernmental organization, Regulatory body, Advisory board
- Legal status: Active
- Headquarters: New York, US
- Head: Chair of the UN Forum on Forests; Kitty Sweeb, UNFF Secretariat Director; Juliette Biao Koudenoukpo
- Parent organization: United Nations Economic and Social Council
- Website: UNFF at un.org

The United Nations Forum on Forests (UNFF) is a high-level intergovernmental policy forum. The forum includes all United Nations member states and permanent observers, the UNFF Secretariat, the Collaborative Partnership on Forests, Regional Organizations and Processes and Major Groups.

== History ==
In 1992, the United Nations Conference on Environment and Development, ("Earth Summit") held in Rio de Janeiro, adopted the Non-legally Binding Authoritative Statement of Principles for a Global Consensus on the Management, Conservation and Sustainable Development of All Types of Forests (Forest Principles) together with Agenda 21, which included a chapter (Chapter 11) on "Combating Deforestation".

Following the Earth Summit, the UN established the Intergovernmental Panel on Forests (IPF) and its successor, the Intergovernmental Forum on Forests (IFF), to implement the Forest Principles and Chapter 11 of Agenda 21. From 1995 to 2000, the IPF/IFF processes dealt with such issues as underlying causes of deforestation; traditional forest-related knowledge; international cooperation in financial assistance and technology transfer; development of criteria and indicators for sustainable forest management; and trade and environment. The IPF/IFF processes resulted in a set of 270 proposals for action for the promotion of the management, conservation and sustainable development of all types of forests.

In 2000, the United Nations Economic and Social Council (ECOSOC) established the United Nations Forum on Forests (UNFF) with the main objective to promote "… the management, conservation and sustainable development of all types of forests and to strengthen long-term political commitment to this end…" based on the Rio Declaration, the Forest Principles, Chapter 11 of Agenda 21 and the outcome of the IPF/IFF Processes and other key milestones of international forest policy...

== Principal functions ==
- To facilitate implementation of forest-related agreements and foster a common understanding on sustainable forest management;
- To provide for continued policy development and dialogue among Governments, international organizations, including major groups, as identified in Agenda 21 as well as to address forest issues and emerging areas of concern in a holistic, comprehensive and integrated manner,
- To enhance cooperation as well as policy and programme coordination on forest-related issues
- To foster international cooperation and
- To monitor, assess and report on progress of the above functions and objectives
- To strengthen political commitment to the management, conservation and sustainable development of all types of forests.

== Global Forest Goals ==
The UN Strategic Plan for Forest (2017–2030) has adopted a set of six Global Forest Goals and 26 associated targets to be reached by 2030, which are voluntary and universal.

Goal 1: Reverse the loss of forest cover worldwide through sustainable forest management, including protection, restoration, afforestation and reforestation, and increase efforts to prevent forest degradation and contribute to the global effort of addressing climate change

Goal 2: Enhance forest-based economic, social and environmental benefits, including by improving the livelihoods of forest-dependent people

Goal 3: Increase significantly the area of protected forests worldwide and other areas of sustainably managed forests, as well as the proportion of forest products from sustainably managed forests

Goal 4: Mobilize significantly increased, new and additional financial resources from all sources for the implementation of sustainable forest management and strengthen scientific and technical cooperation and partnerships

Goal 5: Promote governance frameworks to implement sustainable forest management, including through the United Nations forest instrument, and enhance the contribution of forests to the 2030 Agenda for Sustainable Development

Goal 6: Enhance cooperation, coordination, coherence and synergies on forest-related issues at all levels, including within the United Nations system and across member organizations of the Collaborative Partnership on Forests, as well as across sectors and relevant stakeholders

== United Nations Forest Instrument ==
On December 17, 2007, the UN General Assembly adopted the Non-Legally Binding Instrument on All Types of Forests negotiated by the UNFF earlier that year. The purpose of this instrument is:

- To strengthen political commitment and action at all levels to implement effectively sustainable management of all types of forests and to achieve the shared global objectives on forests;
- To enhance the contribution of forests to the achievement of the internationally agreed development goals, including the Millennium Development Goals, in particular with respect to poverty eradication and environmental sustainability;
- To provide a framework for national action and international cooperation;

On December 22, 2015, the UN General Assembly renamed the instrument to the United Nations Forest Instrument though the content of the instrument did not change. The UN General Assembly also extended the objectives outlined in the global objectives to 2030, in line with the 2030 Agenda For Sustainable Development.

== Collaborative Partnership on Forests ==
The Collaborative Partnership on Forests (CPF), a grouping of 15 forest-related international organizations, institutions and convention secretariats, was established in April 2001, following the recommendation of the Economic and Social Council of the United Nations. The CPF works to support the work of the UNFF and its member countries and to foster increased cooperation and coordination on forests.

=== Wangari Maathai Forest Champion Award ===
In 2012, the Collaborative Partnership on Forests launched the Wangari Maathai Forest Champion Award to honour the life and work of Nobel Peace Prize laureate Wangari Maathai.

Winners include:

- 2012 Narayan Kaji Shrestha; an honourable mention to Kurshida Begum
- 2014 Martha Isabel "Pati" Ruiz Corzo; an honourable mention to Chut Wutty
- 2015 Gertrude Kabusimbi Kenyangi
- 2017 Maria Margarida Ribeiro da Silva
- 2019 Léonidas Nzigiyimpa
- 2022 Cécile Ndjebet
- 2024 Nida Collado

== See also ==
- Forest law enforcement and governance
- International Day of Forests (March 21)
- International Year of Forests (2011)
- UN General Assembly
- United Nations Economic and Social Council
- United Nations System
- Voluntary Partnership Agreements
- United Nations REDD Programme
