= Programme for the Endorsement of Forest Certification =

International, non-profit, non-governmental organization based in Switzerland

- Founded: 1999
- Purpose: Sustainable forestry
- Location: Geneva, Switzerland
- Origins: Europe
- Region served: Global
- Method: Certification
- Key people: Michael Berger
- Website: www.pefc.org

The Programme for the Endorsement of Forest Certification (PEFC) is a certification scheme created by forest owners. PEFC aims to address landowners' interests and enable national standards that align global requirements for environmentally appropriate and socially beneficial forest management practices with the specific realities of individual countries PEFC is an international, non-profit, non-governmental organization. According to PEFC, their certification show that the product originates from "a forest that is managed in line with the strictest environmental, social and economic requirements". As such, the label is assumed to guarantee consumers that the forest has been managed in a sustainable way. The certification takes place through an audit made by an independent third-party company.

Several environmental non-governmental organizations, such as The Wilderness Society, Greenpeace and FERN have criticized the PEFC, based on investigations showing how companies use the results of flawed audits to advertise products and operations as compliant with environmental standards, labour laws and human rights. For instance, investigations show that the rights of local communities and indigenous people were disrespected and biodiversity as well as carbon storage was threatened in PEFC-certified forests, including endangered forests, due to developments and plantations. Establishing links between clear-cut in old-growth PEFC-certified forests in Sweden to companies establish a risk for PEFC-labelling products from unsustainable logged forests. PEFC-certified deforesters have been found to clear 22 000 hectares of natural forest within key strongholds of the endangered orangutan in central Borneo, and the wood in PEFC-certified products have been linked to human right abuses and destruction and deforestation of tropical forests, including the habitat of the critically endangered Malayan tiger.

The origins of these issues can be identified in audit practices, governance, stakeholder consultations, the standards as well as degree transparency of PEFC.

As of 2006, PEFC was considered the certification system of choice for small forest owners in Europe. Its 48 endorsed national forest certification systems represent more than 280 million hectares (690×10^{6} acres) of certified forests. This makes it the largest forest certification system in the world, covering about two-thirds of the globally certified forest area. It is based in Geneva, Switzerland.

== History ==
Forest certification emerged in the early 1990s as a voluntary and market-based mechanisms aiming to promote environmentally appropriate, socially beneficial and economcically viable management of forests. In 1993, the Forest Stewardship Council was established by environmental groups, human rights non-governmental organizations and companies, as a response to the difficulties of nations to agree on forest-related issues concerning biodiversity protection and the Convention of Biological Diversity. The Programme for the Endorsement of Forest Certification was created in 1999 by European forest owners and managers, led by the Confederation of European Forest Owners (CEPF), in order to address private landowners' interests and due to growing demand for certification, particularly in developing countries where the costs of certification could be prohibitive. The main goal of the organization, initially called the Pan-European Forest Certification Council, was to develop a certification system that was flexible and could be adapted to different forest types and management practices, while still meeting rigorous environmental, social, and economic standards. While the Forest Stewardship Council sets international standards, PEFC functions as an umbrella organisation endorsing regional and national forest certification systems.

In 2000, PEFC made its first endorsements of the national standards used by Finland, Sweden, Norway, Germany and Austria. In 2004 it endorsed its first non-European national standards, used by Australia and Chile. As a consequence PEFC changed its name from Pan European Forest Certification to Programme for the Endorsement of Forest Certification Schemes. In 2005 the forest surface certified against PEFC standards reached 100 million hectares after joining of Canada. In 2007 the forest surface certified against PEFC standards reached 200 million hectares. In 2009 the first tropical countries became members of PEFC: Gabon and Malaysia and as of 2015 40 national organizations were members of PEFC. In 2017 the forest surface certified against PEFC standards reached 300 million hectares and as of 2022 there were 55 national organizations members of PEFC.

PEFC recognize that forests play a fundamental role for the planet as they have the potential to mitigate climate change, hold biological diversity, and provide raw materials. According to PEFC themselves, their certification standards are based on the principles of sustainable forest management, which include protecting biodiversity, ensuring the rights and welfare of forest workers and local communities, and promoting responsible forest management practices.

Whether forest certification overall contributes to reduce deforestation and forest degradation is according to research on the issue unclear. A review of the scientific evidence that PEFC have any environmental impact on flora and fauna found that there were few reliable studies, and that the impacts were minor when compared to non-certified forests. Other studies show that PEFC-certification has not halted forest degradation or improved environmental outcomes. These results may be explained by insufficiently stringent standards, monitoring and enforcement.

== The certification process ==
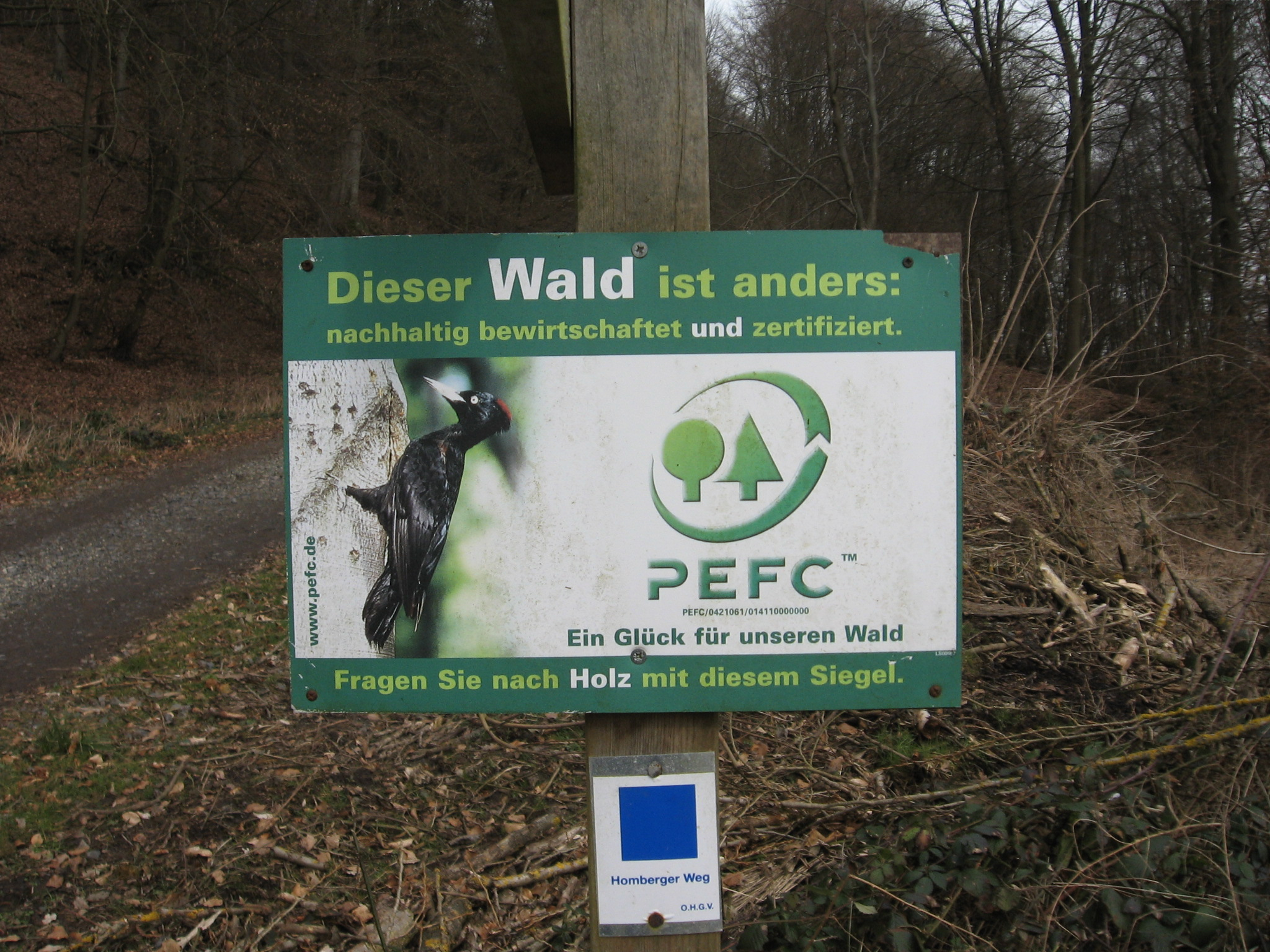
Shield of the Programme for the Endorsement of Forest Certification Schemes (PEFC) at Marburg-Schröck, Germany

PEFC International is the only international forest certification scheme that bases its criteria on internationally accepted intergovernmental conventions and guidelines, thereby linking its sustainability benchmark criteria with existing governmental processes. This includes:

- Pan-European Criteria, Indicators and Operational Level Guidelines for Sustainable Forest Management (Ministerial Conference on the Protection of Forests in Europe)
- ATO/ITTO Principles, criteria and indicators for the sustainable forest management of African natural tropical forests (ATO/ITTO)
- ITTO guidelines on sustainable forest management (ITTO)

PEFC requires adherence to all eight core ILO conventions, even in countries which have not ratified them.

Audits are performed by a third-party auditing firm, a "PEFC-Recognized certification body" in respective country, as suggested by the PEFC webpage. Environmental audit is an industry that assesses and inspect their clients in order to ensure that operations and products are in line with voluntary environmental standards. The auditing firm vet clients and certify that wood-product companies harvest responsible and don't use materials linked to illegal logging and other environmental crimes.

There are reports criticizing this auditing process, highlighting practices that are unsustainable or harmful to the environment and local communities through research into inspection records, environmental violations data and court recordings. These show how audit firms report forest companies to be sustainable despite accusations of logging indigenous forests, false permits, and illegal import of timber.

PEFC only recognizes forests certified to standards that have been reviewed and endorsed by PEFC.

== The development of national standards ==
National certification standards are set adhering to international requirements, demanding that they are developed publicly, and providing an opportunity for national stakeholders to participate in the decision-making process. Standards are required to follow the requirements of ISO/IEC Guide 59:1994 Code of good practice for standardization. National standards must be developed by so-called National Governing Bodies, and meet requirements for transparency, consultation and decision-making by consensus. These guidelines also outline processes for revising and amending standards, and provide those who utilise the standard with the security of future certainty.

=== Endorsements ===
All PEFC-endorsed standards have been subjected to public review during their development. National forest certification systems wanting to obtain PEFC endorsement are subject to an independent assessment to ensure that it meets the PEFC requirements for the standards development process, public review and forest management requirements. The consultant's report is reviewed by an independent Panel of Experts and the PEFC Board, and if satisfactory, the new standard is approved by the PEFC members as a PEFC-endorsed standard. To ensure the independence of the certification bodies, they are not accredited by PEFC itself, but by a national accreditation agency.

According to PEFC themselves, they makes its entire documentation of national forest certification system, including the independent assessments, publicly available in line with its claimed commitment to transparency: information about all issued certificates, including information about suspended, withdrawn and expired certificates, is publicly available on the PEFC website.

This bottom-up process in which national members draft their own standards based on international benchmarks and then seek PEFC endorsement has been criticized by environmental NGOs who have argued that this model allows for weaker safeguards at the national level. While giving flexibility for a country to set up their own standards, this also means that the impact of PEFC in terms of protection biodiversity, human rights and welfare, may vary from country to country. In countries where the forest industry is strong and influential, and where forest policies are more lenient, economic rather than environmental sustainability may be prioritized, while stakeholders representing environmental interests are disregarded or excluded from the process.

=== Countries ===
Countries with PEFC endorsed national certification systems include: Argentina, Australia, Austria, Belarus, Belgium, Brazil, Canada, Chile, China, Czech Republic, Denmark, Estonia, Finland, France, Gabon, Germany, Indonesia, India, Ireland, Italy, Japan, Latvia, Luxembourg, Malaysia, Netherlands, Norway, Poland, Portugal, Russia, Slovak Republic, Slovenia, Spain, Sweden, Switzerland, Romania, Thailand, United Kingdom, United States, Uruguay and Viet Nam.

== Relationship to Forest Stewardship Council ==
Forest Stewardship Council is the main alternative forest certification system. Mutual recognition of FSC and PEFC certified material in the chain of custody has not yet happened. However, FSC and PEFC use the same forest management standard in countries such as the United Kingdom, Switzerland and Norway; Malaysia has submitted its timber certification scheme for PEFC endorsement that is largely based on FSC principles and criteria.

== See also ==
- Deforestation by region
- Rainforest Alliance
