= Brandeis (disambiguation) =

Brandeis is a surname.

Brandeis may also refer to:

- Brandeis University, in Massachusetts, U.S.
- Brandeis-Bardin Institute, now the Brandeis-Bardin Campus of American Jewish University, in California, U.S.
- Louis D. Brandeis School of Law, at the University of Louisville in Kentucky, U.S.
- The Brandeis brief, a 1908 document written by Brandeis as a litigator
- Brandeis Medal, awarded by the University of Louisville's Louis D. Brandeis Society
- Brandeis Award (disambiguation), several different awards
- Kfar Brandeis (English: Brandeis village), a suburb of Hadera, Israel

== See also ==
- Brandys (disambiguation)
- Brandis (surname)
- Brandes (disambiguation)
