= Henning Brandis =

German academic

Professor Dr. Henning Brandis
- Born: 17 July 1916; Elberfeld, Germany
- Died: 16 November 2004 (aged 88); Bonn, Germany
- Scientific career
- Fields: Medical microbiology
- Institutions: Goethe University Frankfurt; University of Göttingen; University of Bonn

Henning Brandis (17 July 1916 – 16 November 2004) was a German physician and microbiologist. He was Professor of Medical Microbiology and Immunology and Director of the Institute for Medical Microbiology and Immunology at the University of Bonn from 1967 until his 1984 retirement. He was editor-in-chief of the journal Zeitschrift für Immunitätsforschung (now Immunobiology). He was a member of the Academy of Sciences Leopoldina and received the Officer's Cross of the Order of Merit of the Federal Republic of Germany in 1976 for services to medical microbiology.

== Background ==
Henning Brandis was a son of supreme court justice Bernhard Brandis and a grandson of the renowned German-British botanist and forestry academic and administrator Sir Dietrich Brandis, who worked with the Imperial Forestry Service in British India and who is considered the father of tropical forestry. Sir Dietrich joined the British civil service in 1856 as superintendent of the teak forests of Pegu division in eastern Burma, shortly after became head of the entire British forestry administration in Burma and later served for two decades as Inspector General of Forests of India, receiving a British knighthood in 1887. Henning Brandis' father was born and grew up in India during the British Raj. The family lived in Calcutta and in Simla during the summer. Henning Brandis and his wife founded the Sir Dietrich Brandis Foundation in 1994.

His great-grandfather was the prominent philosopher Christian August Brandis, who was tutor to the young King Otho of Greece. His great-great-grandfather Joachim Dietrich Brandis was a professor of medicine and moved to Denmark in 1810, where he became personal physician to Queen Marie of Denmark, a Danish Privy Councillor and a member of both the Royal Danish Academy of Sciences and Letters and the Royal Swedish Academy of Sciences. The Brandis family was originally a patrician family from Hildesheim, where several family members served as burgomasters from the 15th century.

== Career ==
He studied medicine at the University of Frankfurt and at the University of Marburg from 1936 to 1942. After earning a doctoral degree, he served in the Army Medical Service for three years. In late 1945 he became an assistant professor in Schlossberger's research group at the Institute for Medical Microbiology and Infection Control at the Goethe University Frankfurt. He was a major contributor to the 1952 edition of the book Experimental Bacteriology. He earned his Habilitation with the dissertation Über die Promunität (Depressionsimmunität) in 1952.

From 1957 he was Professor Ordinarius of Infection Control at the University of Göttingen. In 1967 he became Professor Ordinarius of Medical Microbiology and Immunology and Director of the Institute for Medical Microbiology and Immunology at the University of Bonn. He was elected as a member of the Academy of Sciences Leopoldina in 1974. He became Professor Emeritus in 1984.

Brandis was editor-in-chief of the journal Zeitschrift für Immunitätsforschung (now Immunobiology) and is also known for his textbook Medizinische Mikrobiologie.

== Honours ==
- 1974: Member of the Academy of Sciences Leopoldina
- 1976: Officer's Cross of the Order of Merit of the Federal Republic of Germany
- 1985: Ferdinand Cohn Medal of the German Society for Hygiene and Microbiology
