= Alter Friedhof, Bonn =

Cemetery in Bonn, Germany

Coordinates: 50.7358°N 7.0903°E

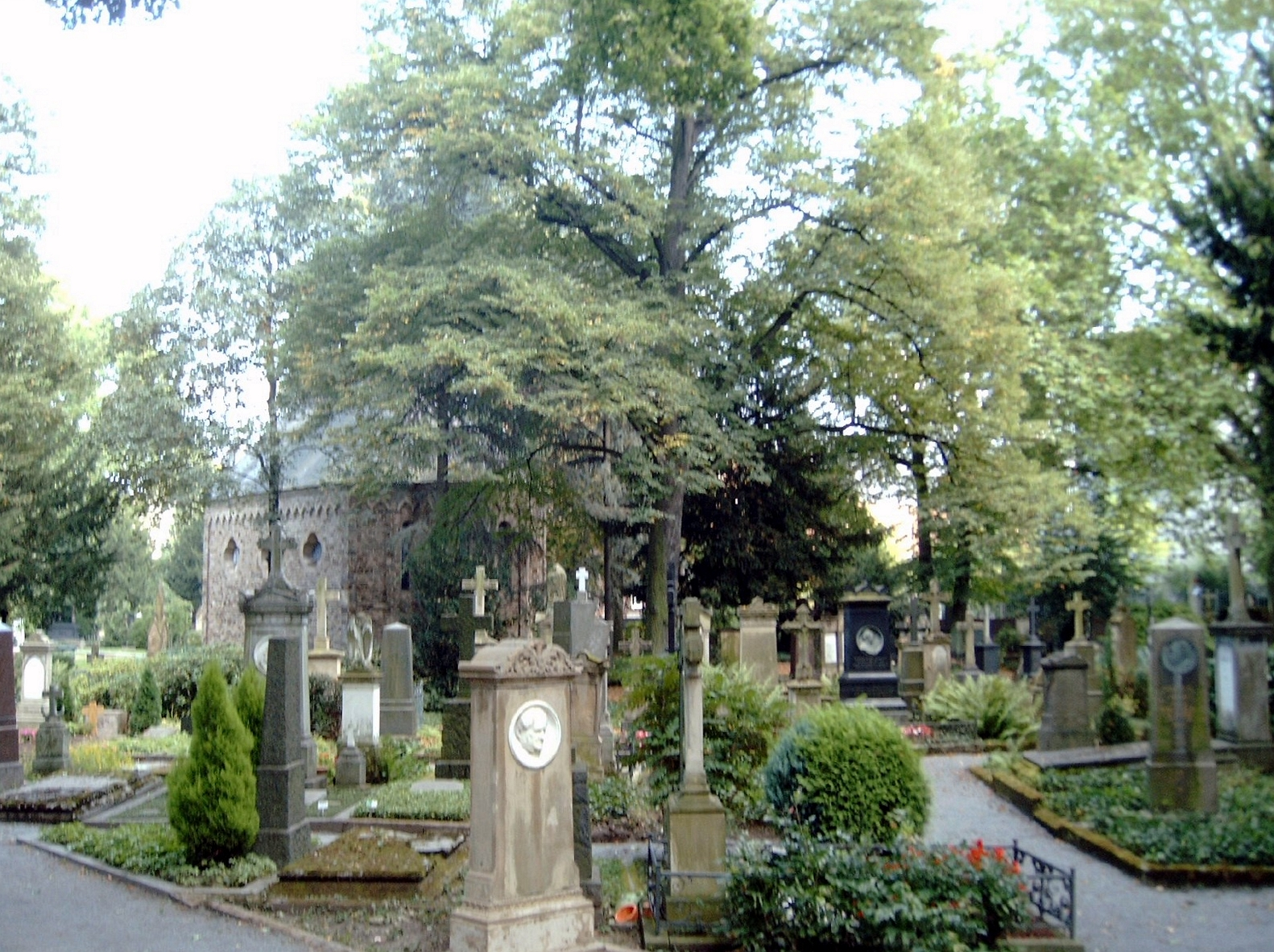
Image of the Alter Friedhof

Alter Friedhof (Old Cemetery) is a historically significant cemetery in Bonn, Germany, 1.2 hectares (3 acres) in area, located near the center of the modern city.

The cemetery was established in 1715 as a cemetery for soldiers and strangers, outside the city walls of the time. It remained in regular use until the new North cemetery opened in 1884, after which burials gradually ceased. It is an area of greenery in the middle of the modern city.

== Notable burials or monuments ==
- Ella Adayevskaya, Russian composer, pianist, and ethnomusicologist
- Friedrich Wilhelm Argelander, astronomer
- Ernst Moritz Arndt, author and poet
- Johann Baptista Baltzer, Catholic theologian
- August Beer, scientist
- Maria Magdalena van Beethoven, mother of Ludwig van Beethoven
- Gustav Bischof, chemist
- Norbert Blüm, Minister of Labour and Social Affairs 1982 - 1998 (CDU)
- Sulpiz Boisserée, art collector, art historian
- Christian August Brandis, philologist and historian of philosophy
- Dietrich Brandis, botanist
- Katharina Brandis, artist
- Heinrich Carl Breidenstein, musicologist
- Christian Charles Josias von Bunsen, diplomat and scholar
- Karl David Wilhelm Busch, surgeon
- Rudolf Clausius, physicist and mathematician
- Ernst Heinrich Karl von Dechen, geologist
- Hermann Deiters, musicologist and philologist
- Friedrich Christoph Dahlmann, historian and politician
- Heinrich Geißler, glassblower and physicist
- Georg Hermes, theologian
- Christine von Hoiningen-Huene, historian
- Leopold Ernst Kaufmann, politician
- William Keogh, Irish judge
- Franz Peter Knoodt, Catholic theologian and church historian
- Christian Lassen, orientalist and Indologist
- August Macke, painter
- Ludwig Clamor Marquart, pharmacist
- August Franz Josef Karl Mayer, anatomist and physiologist
- Otto Gottlieb Mohnike, physician and naturalist
- Karl Friedrich Mohr, chemist
- Christian Friedrich Nasse, physician and psychiatrist
- Wilhelm Neuland, composer and conductor
- Barthold Georg Niebuhr, historian, statesman
- Johann Jakob Nöggerath, mineralogist, geologist
- Julius Plücker, mathematician and physicist
- Elsa Reger, wife of Max Reger and founder of the Max-Reger-Institute
- Joseph Hubert Reinkens, first German Old Catholic bishop
- Franz Anton Ries, violinist; he taught Beethoven violin
- Karl Heinrich Sack, theologian
- Agnes Salm-Salm, American wife of soldier Felix Salm-Salm
- Hermann Schaaffhausen, anatomist, paleoanthropologist, studied Neanderthal remains
- Mildred Scheel, physician and founder of German Cancer Aid; wife of German president Walter Scheel
- August Wilhelm Schlegel, poet, translator, and leading German Romantic
- Ludwig Schopen, classical philologist and Byzantinist
- Adele Schopenhauer, an author, sister of the philosopher Arthur Schopenhauer
- Clara Schumann and Robert Schumann, musicians and composers
- Karl Joseph Simrock, poet, mythologist, translator of the Nibelungenlied
- Nikolaus Simrock, music publisher
- Peter Slodowy, mathematician
- Franz Hermann Troschel, zoologist
- Hermann Usener, scholar of philology and comparative religion
- Gerhard vom Rath, mineralogist
- Charlotte von Lengefeld, writer, wife of Schiller
- Friedrich Gottlieb Welcker, classical philologist and archaeologist
- Mathilde Wesendonck, poet, author, and friend of Richard Wagner
- Karl Joseph Hieronymus Windischmann, philosopher and anthropologist
- Karl Wilhelm Wutzer, surgeon
- Ferdinand Zirkel, geologist, petrographer
