= Brandýs =

Brandýs may refer to places in the Czech Republic:

- Brandýs nad Labem-Stará Boleslav, a town in the Central Bohemian Region
- Brandýs nad Orlicí, a town in the Pardubice Region
- Brandýs, a village and part of Chabeřice in the Central Bohemian Region

== See also ==
- Brandýsek, a municipality and village in the Central Bohemian Region
- Brandys, a surname
