= Experimental Bacteriology =

- Editors: Wilhelm Kolle, Heinrich Hetsch, Hans Schlossberger
- Authors: Wilhelm Kolle, Heinrich Hetsch, Hans Schlossberger, Henning Brandis, Bernhard Schmidt, Hans Georg Haussmann, Gertrud Straulino-von Holzhausen, I. Weimershaus-Eckart, Walther Frieber, Armin Kutzsche, Wolfgang Weimershaus
- Original title: Die experimentelle Bakteriologie und die Infektionskrankheiten mit besonderer Berücksichtigung der Immunitätslehre. Ein Lehrbuch für Studierende, Ärzte und Medizinalbeamte
- Language: German, French, English
- Published: 1906 by Urban & Schwarzenberg; 1910 by Doin; 1934 by Allen & Unwin
- Publication place: Germany
- Pages: 986

Experimental Bacteriology: in Its Applications to the Diagnosis, Epidemiology, and Immunology of Infectious Diseases is a textbook on bacteriology and infectious diseases. It was one of the most authoritative works in medical microbiology in the first half of the 20th century.

Aimed at medical students and practitioners, it has been published in ten/eleven editions in German, and in editions in French and English. The first edition appeared in 1906, written by Wilhelm Kolle and Heinrich Hetsch, and the book is frequently referred to as "Kolle-Hetsch." The eighth (1938) and ninth (1942) editions were edited by Hetsch and Hans Schlossberger. The last, significantly revised and largely newly written edition, numbered as a combined tenth and eleventh edition, was published in 1952 by Urban & Schwarzenberg (now Elsevier) with Hans Schlossberger as general editor, and with contributions from H. Brandis, B. Schmidt, H.G. Haussmann, G. Straulino-v. Holzhausen, I. Weimershaus-Eckart, W. Frieber, A. Kutzsche and W. Weimershaus. Although Schlossberger was general editor, much of the editing work was done by Brandis.

A French translation appeared in 1910, published by Doin, and an English edition was published in 1934 by Allen & Unwin.

== Bibliography ==
- Wilhelm Kolle, Heinrich Hetsch, Die experimentelle Bakteriologie und die Infektionskrankheiten mit besonderer Berücksichtigung der Immunitätslehre. Ein Lehrbuch für Studierende, Ärzte und Medizinalbeamte, Urban & Schwarzenberg, 1906
- Hans Schlossberger (general editor), Experimentelle Bakteriologie und Infektionskrankheiten; mit besonderer Berücksichtigung der Immunitätslehre, 10th/11th significantly revised edition, Urban & Schwarzenberg, 1952
- Wilhelm Kolle, Heinrich Hetsch, La bactériologie expérimentale: appliquée à l'étude des maladies infectieuses, translated by H. Carrière, Paris, Doin, 1910
- Wilhelm Kolle, Heinrich Hetsch, Dagny Erikson, John William Henry Eyre, Experimental Bacteriology in Its Applications to the Diagnosis, Epidemiology, and Immunology of Infectious Diseases, London, Allen & Unwin, 1934
