= Brandis family =

German family

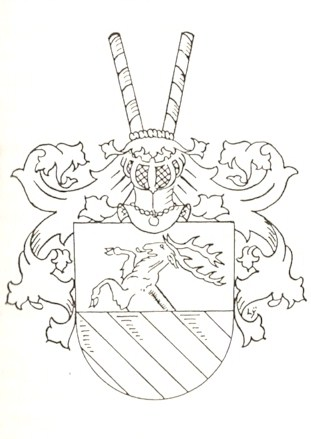
Coat of arms of the Brandis family from Lower Saxony

The Brandis family is a German noble family, originally a patrician family from Lower Saxony and later with ties to Denmark and British India.

== History ==
From the 15th century family members were influential in the politics of Hildesheim and several family members served as Burgomasters. Numerous family members have been noted as lawyers, physicians and academics.

Joachim Dietrich Brandis (1762–1846) was a professor of medicine, and later became personal physician to Queen Marie of Denmark and Norway, a Danish Privy Councillor and a member of both the Royal Danish Academy of Sciences and Letters and the Royal Swedish Academy of Sciences. He was the father of the prominent philosopher Christian August Brandis (1790–1867), who was tutor to the young King Otho of Greece and a professor of philosophy at the University of Bonn. Christian August Brandis was the father of the botanist and forestry academic and administrator Sir Dietrich Brandis (1824–1907), who joined the British civil service in 1856 and eventually served as Inspector General of Forests of India during the British Raj, and who received a British knighthood. Sir Dietrich Brandis was the grandfather of the microbiologist Henning Brandis (1916–2004).

== Titles ==
On 4 March 1769 in Vienna the family received coat of arms and was admitted to the nobility of the Holy Roman Empire by Joseph II. On 10 June 1854 they received the hereditary title of Freiherr in the Kingdom of Hanover. On 2 May 1907 the family was officially admitted into the nobility of the Kingdom of Saxony.
