= Brandis (surname) =

Brandis is a German language surname. Notable people with the surname include:

- Christian August Brandis (1790–1867), German philologist and historian of philosophy
- Dietrich Brandis (1824–1907), German forester considered the father of tropical forestry
- George Brandis (born 1957), Australian politician
- Jock Brandis (born 1946), Canadian author, film technician, and inventor.
- Katharina Brandis (1841–1928), German artist
- Mark Brandis (1931–2000), German science fiction writer and journalist
- Jonathan Brandis (1976–2003), American actor, director, and screenwriter.
- Thomas Brandis (1935–2017), German violinist, former concertmaster of the Berlin Philharmonic
- Lata Brandisová (1895–1981), Czech equestrian

== See also ==
- Brandys (disambiguation)
- Brandeis
- Brandejs
- Brandes (disambiguation)
- Brindisi
