= Gustav Berdel =

German veterinarian

Oberveterinärrat Gustav Berdel Dr.med.vet.
- Born: 28 February 1872; Neckarbischofsheim
- Died: 13 February 1949 (aged 76); Frankfurt
- Education: Berlin Veterinary College
- Occupations: Chief veterinarian in Frankfurt and managing director of the slaughterhouse in Frankfurt Municipality
- Awards: Knight's cross with oak leaves and swords of the Order of the Zähringer Lion, 1915

Jakob Gustav Berdel (born 28 February 1872 in Neckarbischofsheim, died 13 February 1949 in Frankfurt) was a German veterinarian, who served as municipal chief veterinarian (städtischer Obertierarzt) in Frankfurt and managing director of the slaughterhouse in Frankfurt Municipality, at the time one of the largest and most modern in Europe. He was licensed as a veterinarian in 1898 and obtained a doctorate in veterinary medicine (Dr.med.vet.) from the Berlin Veterinary College in 1920. During the First World War, he was also a military veterinarian (captain of the Reserve) of the Reserve Field Artillery Regiment No. 21 staff. He received the honorary title Oberveterinärrat (senior veterinary councillor). He was also involved with several veterinary societies. He was a member of the Senckenberg Nature Research Society.

He was married to Hermine Bovensiepen, and they had one daughter, the pediatrician (Dr.med.) Erika Henriette Berdel (1919–1951).

== Publications (incomplete) ==
- Berdel G (1930). Verschleppung von Schweinefinnen aus dem Ausland nach dem Inland. Zeischrift für Fleisch- und Milchhygiene 40(10):201–202
- Berdel G (1920). Die Ohrräude des Kaninchens, Berlin Veterinary College, doctoral dissertation in veterinary medicine, 1920
- Bierbaum К; Berdel G (1914). Die Diagnose der Bindertuberkulose mittels der Komplementbindungsreaktion nach der Methode von Hammer. Zeitschrift für Immunitätsforschung 21:1–5,249

== Honours ==
- (Grand Duchy of Baden) Knight's cross with oak leaves and swords of the Order of the Zähringer Lion, 1915
- (German Empire) Iron Cross (First World War)
- The title Oberveterinärrat
