= Hans Schlossberger =

German physician (1887–1960)

- Born: 22 September 1887; Alpirsbach
- Died: 27 January 1960 (aged 72); Stuttgart
- Citizenship: German
- Education: University of Tübingen; Ludwig-Maximilians-Universität München; University of Strasbourg
- Scientific career
- Fields: Immunology, medical microbiology, chemotherapy
- Workplaces: Paul Ehrlich Institute, Robert Koch Institute, University of Jena, Goethe University Frankfurt
- Academic advisors: Paul Ehrlich, Emil von Behring

Hans Otto Friedrich Schlossberger (born 22 September 1887 in Alpirsbach, died 27 January 1960 in Stuttgart) was a German physician, who was known for his research in immunology, medical microbiology, epidemiology and antimicrobial chemotherapy, especially on syphilis, typhus, gas gangrene, diphtheria, erysipeloid of Rosenbach, tuberculosis, malaria and leptospirosis. He was one of the leading immunologists and bacteriologists of Germany during his lifetime, and was a student and collaborator of the Nobel laureates Paul Ehrlich and Emil von Behring, two of the principal founders of the field of immunology.

From 1946 to 1955, he was Professor of Medical Microbiology and Infection Control and Director of the Institute for Medical Microbiology and Infection Control at the Goethe University Frankfurt, and also served as Dean of the Faculty of Medicine 1952–1953. He edited the journal Medical Microbiology and Immunology and the influential book Experimental Bacteriology.

== Career ==
He studied medicine at the University of Tübingen, the Ludwig-Maximilians-Universität München and the University of Strasbourg, and obtained his doctorate in medicine at Tübingen in 1913 with the dissertation Beiträge zur Serodiagnose der Syphilis mittels der Wassermannschen Reaktion. He worked as an intern for the Nobel laureate Paul Ehrlich at the Royal Institute for Experimental Therapy while preparing his dissertation from 1912. After working at the German Hospital in London, he was employed as scientific assistant of the Nobel laureate Emil von Behring at Marburg University Center of Hygiene. He served as a military physician in the Army Medical Service during the First World War. From 1917 to 1929, he worked at the National Institute for Experimental Therapy (now the Paul Ehrlich Institute). In 1929, he joined the Federal Health Bureau (Reichsgesundheitsamt) as a government councillor and subsequently as a senior government councillor. From 1935 to 1941, he was director of one of the departments at the Robert Koch Institute.

He was Professor of Hygiene and Director of the Institute of Hygiene at the University of Jena from 1941. From 1946 to 1955, he held the chair in medical microbiology and infection control at the Goethe University Frankfurt and was Director of its Institute for Medical Microbiology and Infection Control (Hygiene-Institut). He also served as Dean of the Faculty of Medicine from 1952 to 1953. He was editor-in-chief of Medical Microbiology and Immunology, a journal founded by Robert Koch. He was also editor of the most recent editions of the influential book Experimental Bacteriology.

He was a member of the Academy of Sciences Leopoldina, in the section Microbiology and Immunology.

== Personal life ==
He was a son of the physician and numismatist Hans Schlossberger Sr. (1855–1927), a grandson of the noted biochemist Julius Eugen Schlossberger (one of the disciples of Justus von Liebig) and a descendant of burgomaster of Esslingen Georg Andreas Schlossberger (1666–1737). In 1918, he married Gertrud Benger, and they had three children.

== Selected works ==
- Beiträge zur Serodiagnose der Syphilis mittels der Wassermannschen Reaktion, Fischer, Jena 1913.
- Die wissenschaftlichen Grundlagen und praktischen Ergebnisse der Chemotherapie der Infektionskrankheiten, Fischers med. Buchh., Berlin 1925
- Handbuch der Chemotherapie (2 vols. 1932 and 1934, with Viktor Fischl)
- Die Bekämpfung der epidemischen Poliomyelitis mit Rekonvaleszentenserum, Behringwerke, I. G. Farbenindustrie A. G., Leverkusen 1935 (with Richard Bieling, Hellmut Eckhardt)
- Chaulmoograöl : Geschichte, Herkunft, Zusammensetzung, Pharmakologie, Chemotherapie, Springer, Berlin 1938.
- Kriegsseuchen : Historischer Überblick über ihr Auftreten u. ihre Bekämpfung, Fischer, Jena 1945.
- Wilhelm Kolle, Heinrich Hetsch, Hans Schlossberger, et al., Experimentelle Bakteriologie und Infektionskrankheiten mit besonderer Berücksichtigung der Immunitätslehre, 10th significantly revised edition, Munich, Urban & Schwarzenberg, 1952
