= Brandes =

Brandes is a German surname and Jewish surname, and may refer to:

- Bernd Jürgen Brandes (1958–2001), German cannibalism victim
- Bruno Brandes (1910–1985), German lawyer and politician (CDU), MdB, MdL Niedersachsen
- Charles Brandes, American financial consultant
- Christian Brandes (born 1971), German politician (Partei Rechtsstaatlicher Offensive)
- David Brandes (born 1968), German musician
- Detlef Brandes (born 1941), German historian and professor at Heinrich Heine University of Düsseldorf
- Dietmar Brandes (born 1948), German botanist, professor and librarian
- Dirk Brandes (born 1974), German politician
- Eddo Brandes, cricketer from Zimbabwe
- Edvard Brandes (1847–1931), Danish Cultural politician and editor and co-founder of the newspaper Politiken, brother of Georg Brandes
- Ernst Brandes (journalist) (1758–1810), German lawyer
- Ernst Brandes (1862–1935), German lawyer, estate manager and politician
- Ernst Immanuel Cohen Brandes (1844–1892), Danish economist and newspaper editor
- Esther Charlotte Brandes (1742–1786), actress
- Georg Brandes (1842–1927), Danish writer and literature critic, brother of Edvard Brandes
- Gustav Brandes (1842–1941), German zoologist
- Heinrich Brandes (1803–1868), German landscape painter
- Heinrich Wilhelm Brandes (1777–1834), German astronomer, mathematician and physicist
- Ina Brandes (born 1977), German politician (CDU)
- Jan Laurens Andries Brandes (1857–1905), Dutch historian
- Johann Christian Brandes (1735–1799), German dramatist
- John Brandes (born 1964), American football player
- Lothar Brandes (1926–2011), German painter
- Marthe Brandès (1862–1930), French actress
- Peter Brandes (1944–2025), Danish painter, sculptor, ceramic artist, and photographer
- Raymond S. Brandes (1924–2014), American archeologist and historian
- Rudolph Simon Brandes (1795–1842), German naturalist and pharmacist
- Werner Brandes (1889–1968), German cameraman
- Wilhelm Brandes (1854–1928), German writer
- Will Brandes (1928–1990), German pop singer
- Winfried Brandes (born 1942), managing director of 'Prussian Memorial Institute e.V.'

== See also ==
- Brand (surname)
- Brandeis
- Brandis (surname)
