= Seting clothes and Cual cloth =

Traditional clothes from the Bangka Belitung Islands

Seting clothes and Cual cloth are traditional clothes from the Bangka Belitung Islands in Indonesia. Cual cloth has similarities with songket cloth, which is typical of Palembang, as both are quite complicated and take a long time to produce. Due to its long production time, Cual cloth is often expensive and is associated with traditional royal clothing, weddings and various other major events. At large events, the Cual Cloth is paired with the Seting Shirt. Cual cloth is a cloth native to the Bangka Belitung culture which is made using the traditional ikat weaving method.

== Bridal clothes ==
The clothes worn by Bangka Belitung brides are Seting Clothes and Cual Cloth. Apart from that, this shirt is equipped with several accessories. Brides in Bangka Belitung wear the traditional Baju Seting attire. This clothing has the form of an ordinary clothes bracket, red color made from velvet or silk cloth. The bottom clothes of this set of clothes are cual cloth, which is often also called lasem cloth or besusur cloth. Cual cloth is a cloth native to the culture of the Bangka Belitung people, made using the ikat weaving method. There are 2 motifs, namely the Penganten Bekecak motif (full pattern), and the Jande Bekecak motif (empty space motif). Some of them are special footwear called pending slippers or Arabic sandals which have a special characteristic, namely that the tip is sharp like a boat.

The traditional wedding attire for native men from Bangka Belitung is a long robe. The characteristic of this robe is the Arabic pattern on the robe and its dark red or dark red color. This robe is equipped with a long cloth in the form of a shawl. Usually this cloth is worn by slinging it over the right shoulder sideways. The bottom part of this clothing is trousers with a color that matches the color of the top worn. Apart from that, the top and bottom of this outfit are decorated with motifs that match the clothes worn by the bride.

== History ==
According to the story that has developed in the Bangka Belitung community, Seting clothes and Cual cloth are a combination of Arab and Chinese culture. In the past, there was a rich Arab merchant who came to Bangka Belitung to trade and spread the Islamic religion. This is because the location of Bangka Belitung was very strategic in maritime trade in the past, thus making the cultural acculturation of the Bangka Belitung people with immigrant communities very clearly felt in this area. Not long after, the merchant found a wife of Chinese descent who lived in the Mentok area. This merchant fell in love with a Chinese girl and then married the Chinese girl. At this wedding they wore their respective traditional clothes. This husband and wife usually wear clothes with the type of Seting Shirt and Cual Cloth which attract the attention of local residents. After this, there were many Chinese and Arab people who came to migrate to the island of Bangka, especially to Mentok City which was the center of government at that time, some of whom married native people, or among themselves, so there were many island residents. Bangka who imitated these clothes. Apart from that, based on information from the public, many of the native people of Bangka Belitung were originally brought and worn by Arab brothers who married local Chinese girls, so that since then this clothing has been used as traditional clothing. In development, local residents mix and match the Seting Clothes and Cual Cloth with local styles of native Malay culture from Bangka Belitung. So in general, these clothes are a combination of Arab, Chinese and Malay culture. The native people of Bangka come from the Sekak tribe. The Sekak tribe itself is a group of Malay people who inhabit the coasts of Bangka Belitung. In its development, the Sekak tribe people became the original inhabitants of Bangka Belitung. In these islands, people created and preserved culture until it survived until now. Of the many cultural variations of Bangka Belitung, one of the cultural heritages known from the Sekak tribe is the traditional clothing of the Bangka Belitung Islands, namely the Seting Baju and Cual Cloth.

In the past, this Cual cloth could be called Limar Muntok. At first glance, the Limar Muntok motif is similar to songket cloth from South Sumatra. However, there is a slight difference, namely that there will be a floral motif. These floral motifs resemble clove flowers, cempaka, animal motifs and plant motifs. The motifs on this Cual Cloth are the Kembang Kenanga, Duck, Jellyfish, Peacock, Kembang Rukem and Kembang Setaman motifs. According to the story, this cloth, which is also often called the Limar Muntok cloth, developed in a city called Muntok. This happened precisely in the 17th century. This cloth was first introduced by the great-grandfather of the founder of the Cual Ishadi cloth shop in Pangkal Pinang. This cloth is almost similar to Palembang songket, its shape is similar to songket, indicating the influence of Malay culture. This cloth is made manually using weaving techniques. Malay motifs with bright colors and floral and fauna motifs are unique to this Cual cloth.

The process of making Cual Cloth is quite complicated because the materials used are quite unique and require effort to obtain. This causes the price of this fabric to be quite expensive. The materials for making this cloth are polyester, silk, cotton, wood fiber and some also use 18 carat gold thread. So you can imagine the reason why this fabric is quite expensive. Apart from containing its own historical value, this traditional clothing also has philosophical value. The arrangement of motifs on Cual Cloth not only depicts the beauty of the complicated weaving process but also the complexity of the materials that make it up. So this Cual cloth is often used as oversized clothing among the nobility, as bridal clothing, and other oversized clothing. This Cual cloth is a typical counterpart to the Ceting shirt which is also known as the Seting shirt which is made from silk or velvet. Usually mothers work on Cual Cloth while filling their free time. However, nowadays, in the charcoal era, you can find a lot of Cual cloth or Cual patterned cloth which is used as uniform cloth in several elementary schools and government offices.

== Accessories ==
This traditional clothing is usually worn at traditional events or several formal occasions. For important occasions, Seting Clothes and Cual Cloth are usually worn along with crowns (paksian) worn by women and turbans (sungkon) worn by men.[1] The crown (paksian) is a gold-colored accessory equipped with special ornaments in the form of a lotus flower which is used as a breast covering on clothes, goyang flowers, bamboo leaves, cempaka flowers, tenggalung fence, moon juice, cempaka florets, and the head decoration is a bun cap. or flowers. Apart from that, long necklaces and earrings, shrimp pins or ornaments pinned to both earlobes, large pending bracelets; These bracelets are usually used as belt accessories, as well as ronce jasmine decorations that are attached to clothes. So if summarized, the accessories used are

- Gold crown with a special ornament called paksian
- Lotus or breast covering worn on clothes
- Tembbang Cempaka
- Tembang Goyang
- Bamboo leaves
- Cempaka florets
- Hanging fence
- Moon essence
- Close the bun or what is also called flower hong as a head decoration
- Long Earrings Necklace
- Shrimp sticks are used for decoration placed on the left and right ears
- Pending bracelet used as a belt
- Melati Ronce decoration attached to the clothes worn.
