= Christine von Hoiningen-Huene =

German-born Swiss historian, writer (1848–1920)

- Born: 21 July 1848; Koblenz, Germany
- Died: 21 January 1920 (aged 71); Zurich, Switzerland
- Burial place: Bonn, Germany
- Other name: Baronness von Hoiningen-Huene
- Occupations: Historian, writer

Christine Ernestine Maria von Hoiningen-Huene (21 July 1848 – 21 January 1920) was a German-born Swiss historian and writer. She was one of the first women to earn a doctoral degree in Bern, Switzerland despite being labeled as mentally incapacitated by her family after her divorce.

== Biography ==
Baroness Christine von Hoiningen-Huene was born 21 July 1848 in Koblenz, Germany as the daughter of mining councilor Anselm August Freiherr von Hoiningen, known as Huene, and his wife Marie, née Longard. Christine held the title of Baroness.

She published her first works anonymously, including a biography of the follower of the Old Catholic Church, Amalie von Lasaulx in 1878. In 1881, her writings attracted the attention of Catholic historian Ignaz von Döllinger who actively encouraged Hoiningen-Huene to pursue historical studies.

On 15 April 1888, she married a reluctant groom Otto Perthes, a high school teacher in Bielefeld. On 26 September 1893, the marriage was dissolved due to "misconceptions" and Christine took back her own family name. However, after her divorce, her two younger brothers, Ernst and Hans, took legal action to have her declared "mentally incapacitated" in 1895, which caused her serious problems for the rest of her life. One consequence was that it denied her access to her family's historic wealth, forcing her to support herself through her writing.

=== Switzerland ===
By 1896, she was living in Zurich and studying German legal history and German and French literary history at the University of Zurich. While living there, she was able to earn money by writing commissioned historical works.

In 1898, Hoiningen-Huene began studying in Bern where her instructors included the Old Catholic professors Eugène Michaud and Philipp Woker, among others. In 1899, she was one of the first women to be earn a doctoral degree magna cum laude in Bern. Her dissertation was titled References to the History of the Conquest of Switzerland and Holland in the 17th century.

After the turn of the century, she supported herself by researching the genealogy of Swiss noble families. Until shortly before her death, she published several historical studies, both large and small. In addition, beginning in April 1904, she worked as a permanent contributor to the Lucerne daily newspaper "Tages-Anzeiger." She also tried in vain to find other jobs;"

In 1903, she made a legal application to have her incapacitation lifted. The Neuwied Regional Court rejected her application, but on 19 November 1906, her affliction was officially changed from "mental illness" to "mental weakness." However, it did not lift the incapacitation itself.

=== Death ===
Christine von Hoiningen-Huene died at 71 on 21 January 1920 in Zurich, Switzerland. The urn containing her ashes was interred at her parents' gravesite in Bonn, Germany at the Old Cemetery.

== Selected works ==
- von Hoiningen-Huene, Christine. Erinnerungen an Amalie von Lasaulx, Schwester Augustine, Oberin der Barmherzigen Schwestern im St. Johannishospital zu Bonn. Perthes, 1878.
- Hoiningen-Huene, Christine von. "Erinnerungen an Amalie von Lasaulx, Schwester Augustine, Oberin der Barmherzigen Schwestern im St. Johannishospital zu Bonn: mit 5 Porträts." (1891).
- von Hoiningen-Huene, Christine. "Beiträge zur Geschichte der Beziehungen der Schweiz und Holland im XVII. Jahrhundert." PhD dissertation., Anhaltische Buchdr. Gutenberg, 1899.
- Hoiningen-Huene, Christine Freifrau von. "Die deutsche Justiz und das Entmündigungsgesetz." (No Title).
