= Indian Trees =

1906 monograph by Dietrich Brandis

Indian Trees: An Account of Trees, Shrubs, Woody Climbers, Bamboos, and Palms Indigenous or Commonly Cultivated in the British Indian Empire
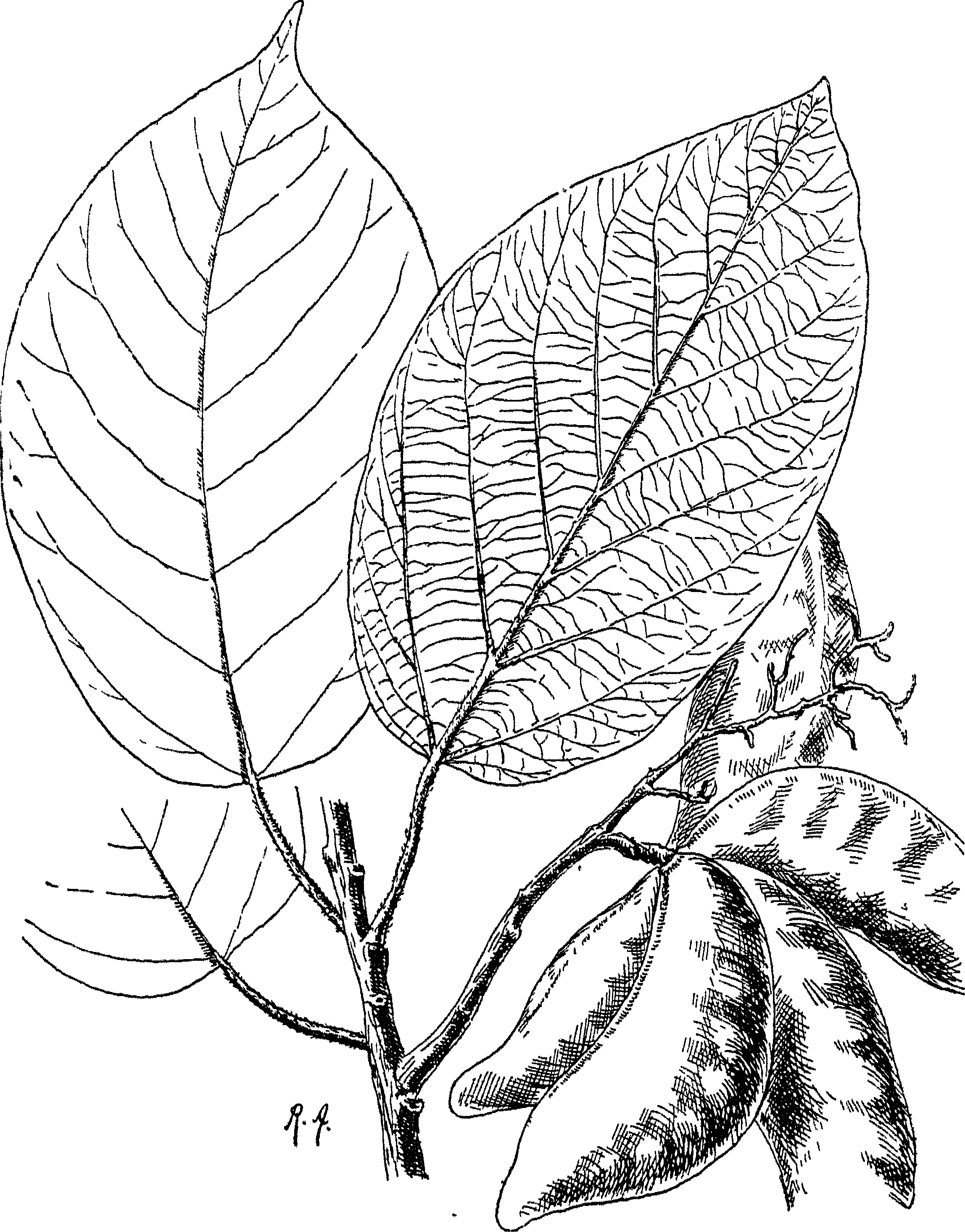
- An illustration of sterculia guttata from Indian Trees
- Authors: Sir Dietrich Brandis
- Language: English
- Published: 1906 by Archibald Constable & Co.
- Publication place: United Kingdom
- Pages: 801

Indian Trees: An Account of Trees, Shrubs, Woody Climbers, Bamboos, and Palms Indigenous or Commonly Cultivated in the British Indian Empire is a monograph on the trees of India, written by the German–British botanist and forestry administrator Sir Dietrich Brandis and published in London in 1906 by Archibald Constable & Co.

An extensive work of 801 pages, the book is regarded as his magnum opus and a seminal work on Indian trees. Brandis was regarded as the "father of tropical forestry;" he worked with the British Imperial Forestry Service in colonial India for nearly 30 years, and served as Inspector General of Forests in India from 1864 to 1883.

== See also ==
- Trees of India
- Flora of India

== Bibliography ==
- Sir Dietrich Brandis, Indian Trees: An Account of Trees, Shrubs, Woody Climbers, Bamboos, and Palms Indigenous or Commonly Cultivated in the British Indian Empire, London, Archibald Constable & Co., 1906
