= Hans Georg Haussmann =

Physician, Microbiologist

Hans Georg Haussmann (also spelled Haußmann) (23 May 1919, in Stuttgart – 22 August 2000) was a German physician, microbiologist, and expert on transfusion medicine.

He earned his doctoral degree at the University of Strasbourg in 1944 and worked at the Institute for Medical Microbiology and Infection Control at the Goethe University Frankfurt from 1948 to 1956. He was a contributor to the book Experimental Bacteriology.

He was the founding Managing Director of the Red Cross Transfusion Centre in Baden-Württemberg from 1956 and was also a Professor of Transfusion Medicine at the Technical University of Munich from 1970.
