= Bernhard Brandis =

German supreme court justice

Bernhard Brandis Dr.jur.

Judge on the Imperial Court of Justice
- In office 1929–1935

Personal details
- Born: 15 January 1875 Dehradun, India
- Died: 14/15 January 1935 Leipzig, Germany
- Children: Henning Brandis
- Parent(s): Sir Dietrich Brandis and Lady Katharina Brandis

Bernhard Friedrich Brandis (born 15 January 1875 in Dehradun, India, died 14/15 January 1935 in Leipzig) was a German supreme court justice.

== Early life ==
He grew up in India, and was a son of the botanist and forestry administrator Sir Dietrich Brandis, the Inspector General of Forests of India, and Lady Katharina Brandis, known as Kate. His father had joined the British civil service in India in 1856. The family lived in Calcutta and in Simla during the summer.

== Judicial career ==
As of 1914, he was a judge on a regional court in Elberfeld. He was appointed as a judge (Reichsgerichtsrat) on the Imperial Court of Justice in 1929 and died in office in 1935. His former law clerk Ernst Eduard Hirsch described him as "brought up to be a gentleman" and highly erudite.

== Family ==
Bernhard Brandis was the father of the noted microbiologist Henning Brandis. He should not be confused with his uncle, the physician Bernhard Brandis (1826–1911), or with Ernst Brandis, of no relation, who was a judge on the Imperial Court of Justice from 1937.

== Publications ==
- Die Graphologie im Dienste des Kaufmanns: Eine Einführung in die Grundlehren der Handschriften-Deutungskunde und ihre Anwendung im kaufmännischen Betrieb sowie praktische, allgemeinverständliche Anleitung, um aus der Handschrift Charakter, Gemütsstimmung, Verstellung und Fälschung der Handschrift bestimmen zu können, L. Huberti, 1905, 79 pages
