= Wolfgang Weimershaus =

German physician

Wolfgang Weimershaus (born 6 July 1922 – 16 March 2008) was a German physician, microbiologist, politician of the liberal Free Democratic Party, and poet.

== Career ==
He studied medicine in Breslau, Strasbourg, Göttingen and Jena until 1946, and worked at the Institute for Medical Microbiology and Infection Control at the Goethe University Frankfurt from 1947 to 1952, where he contributed to the book Experimental Bacteriology. From 1952 he practised in Offenbach as a specialist in laboratory medicine, one of Germany's first specialists in this field.

He was chairman of the FDP group in the city council of Offenbach from 1956 to 1967. He was also involved with several medical associations, and was President of the Frankfurt Chamber of Doctors from 1966 to 1972 and a member of the presidium of the Hesse Chamber of Doctors from 1976. He co-founded the German Association for Laboratory Medicine in 1951.

He received the Bundesverdienstkreuz in 1987.

== Poetry ==
Weimershaus published several collections of poetry, including Irgendwo Wolken (1982), Im Labyrinth der Phantasie (1984) and Sage und schreibe (1985).

== Honours ==
- Honorary Plaque of the Hesse Chamber of Doctors, 1983
- Bundesverdienstkreuz, 1987
