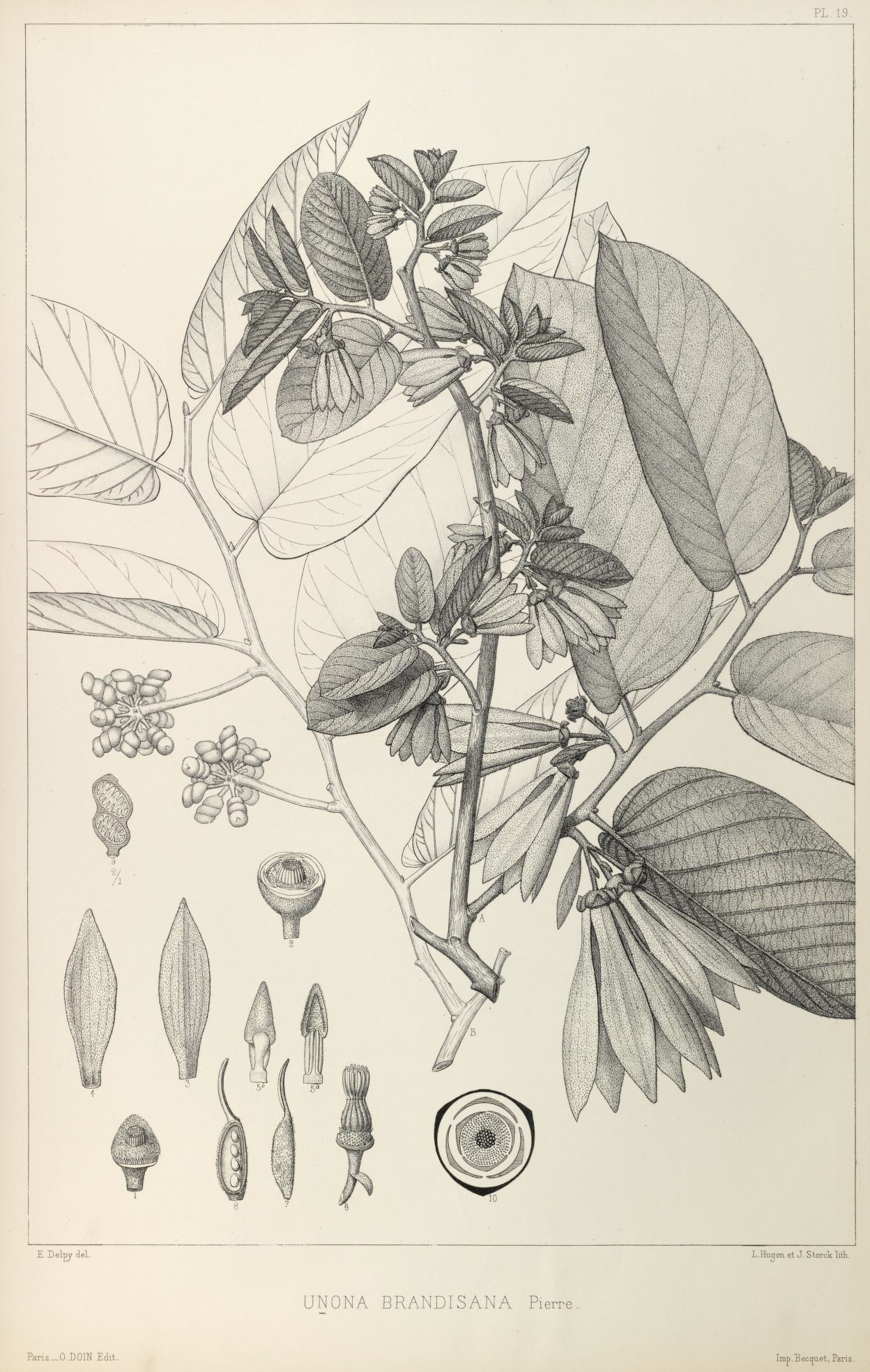
- Botanical illustration of Cananga brandisiana (labeled using its basionym Unona brandisiana)

Conservation status
- Least Concern (IUCN 3.1)

Scientific classification
- Kingdom: Plantae
- Clade: Embryophytes
- Clade: Tracheophytes
- Clade: Spermatophytes
- Clade: Angiosperms
- Clade: Magnoliids
- Order: Magnoliales
- Family: Annonaceae
- Genus: Cananga
- Species: C. brandisiana

Binomial name
- Cananga brandisiana (Pierre) Saff.

Synonyms
- Cananga latifolia Finet & Gagnep.; Canangium brandisanum (Pierre) Saff.; Canangium latifolium Pierre ex Ridl.; Unona brandisiana Pierre; Unona latifolia Hook.f. & Thomson

= Cananga brandisiana =

Species of plant

Cananga brandisiana is a species of flowering plant in the family Annonaceae. It is native to Cambodia, Laos, Malaysia, Myanmar, Thailand, and Vietnam. Jean Baptiste Louis Pierre, the French botanist who first formally described the species, using the basionym Unona brandisiana, named it in honor of Sir Dietrich Brandis, the German botanist for whom Pierre worked in the Indian Forest Service (then called the Imperial Forestry Service) in Calcutta.

== Description ==
It is a tree reaching 25 meters in height. Its trunk has grey bark. Its long branches have a round cross-section and are covered in woolly hairs when young, but are hairless when mature. Its petioles are 12–20 mm long and covered in woolly hairs. Its hairless, elliptical leaves are 8–16 by 7–11 cm. One to eight fragrant flowers are on peduncles that are 10–20 mm long. Subtending the peduncles are oval bracts that are 1.5-2.0 by 2.0 cm and covered in woolly hairs. About midway along the length of the peduncles is a bracteole that is 8 by 2–5 mm and covered in woolly hairs. Its sepals are 5 mm long and come to a shallow point. Its oblong, fleshy petals are 4–7 cm long and 2 cm wide at their widest point. The petals come to a point at their tip and are covered in woolly hairs. The flowers have about 240 stamens. The receptacles of the flowers are hairy. Its flowers have 24 carpels that are covered in fine downy hairs. Its styles are hairless. Its ovaries have variable numbers of ovules. Its cylindrical fruit is on pedicels that are 5 mm long. The contour of the fruit is constricted around its seeds. The fruit contains two or three flattened, brown, shiny seeds that are 6 by 12 mm.

=== Reproductive biology ===
The pollen of C. brandisiana is shed as permanent tetrads.

=== Habitat and distribution ===
Pierre described it in 1881 as growing commonly in the forest areas in China and Cambodia.

=== Uses ===
In Cambodia, it is called by the common name chkè sraèng, and is used in traditional medicine to treat fever. Bioactive molecules isolated from its bark, including acetogenins have been reported to have cytotoxic properties in tests with cancer cell lines. Juvenile hormones, which are known to regulate insect development, have also been extracted from its bark. Pierre noted that its soft, white wood can be used in woodworking to create vases, boxes, and tool handles.
