= Julius Eugen Schlossberger =

German physician and biochemist

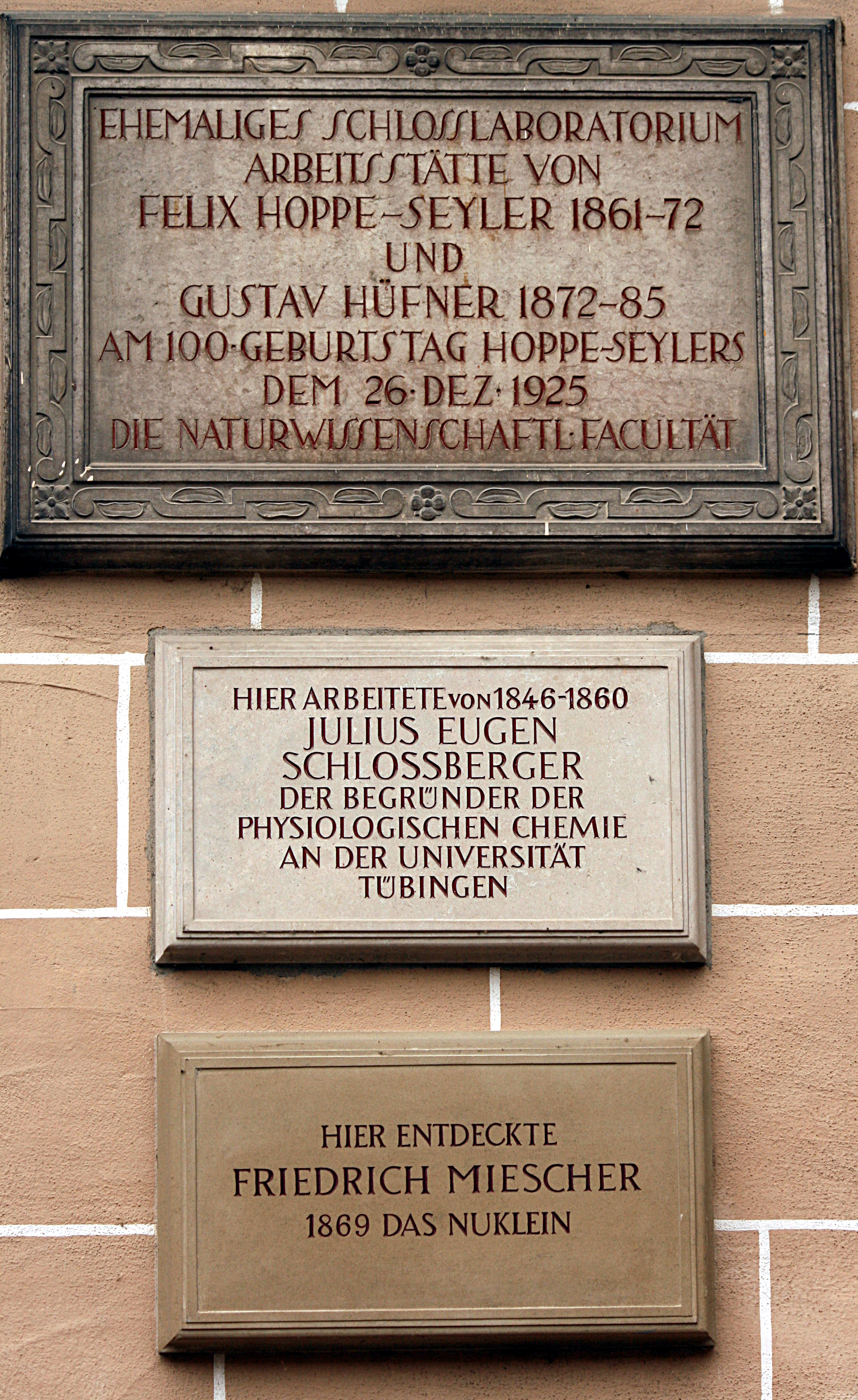
- Schlossberger's memorial plaque in Tübingen
- Born: 31 May 1819; Stuttgart, Kingdom of Württemberg, German Confederation
- Died: 9 July 1860 (aged 41); Tübingen, Kingdom of Württemberg, German Confederation
- Other name: Julius Eugen Schloßberger
- Occupations: Physicist, biochemist
- Relatives: Hans Schlossberger (grandson)

Academic background
- Influences: Justus von Liebig; William Gregory

Academic work
- Institutions: University of Edinburgh; University of Tübingen
- Notable works: Lehrbuch der organischen Chemie (1850)

Julius Eugen Schlossberger (31 May 1819, in Stuttgart – 9 July 1860, in Tübingen), also spelled Julius Eugen Schloßberger, was a German medical doctor and biochemist. He was a student of Justus von Liebig and was one of the leading physiological chemists in his lifetime.

== Biography ==
He obtained his doctorate in medicine and surgery (Dr. med. et chir.) at the age of 21, and worked at St. Catherine's Hospital in Stuttgart and as the private physician to a count, before continuing his studies in Vienna, Paris and Giessen. In Giessen, he came under the influence and patronage of Liebig, who introduced him to the field of physiological chemistry. From 1845, he worked at the chemical laboratory of William Gregory (himself a student of Liebig) at the University of Edinburgh, before he became professor at the University of Tübingen.

He published several works analysing and summarising different physiological subfields, and on the chemical composition of body tissues such as muscles (creatine), brain tissue, breast milk, respiration, food chemistry, pathobiochemical investigations, and also purely chemical analyses. He also published a textbook on organic chemistry in 1850, titled Lehrbuch der organischen Chemie.

He was the grandfather of the immunologist Hans Schlossberger.
