= Heinrich Carl Breidenstein =

German musicologist (1796–1876)

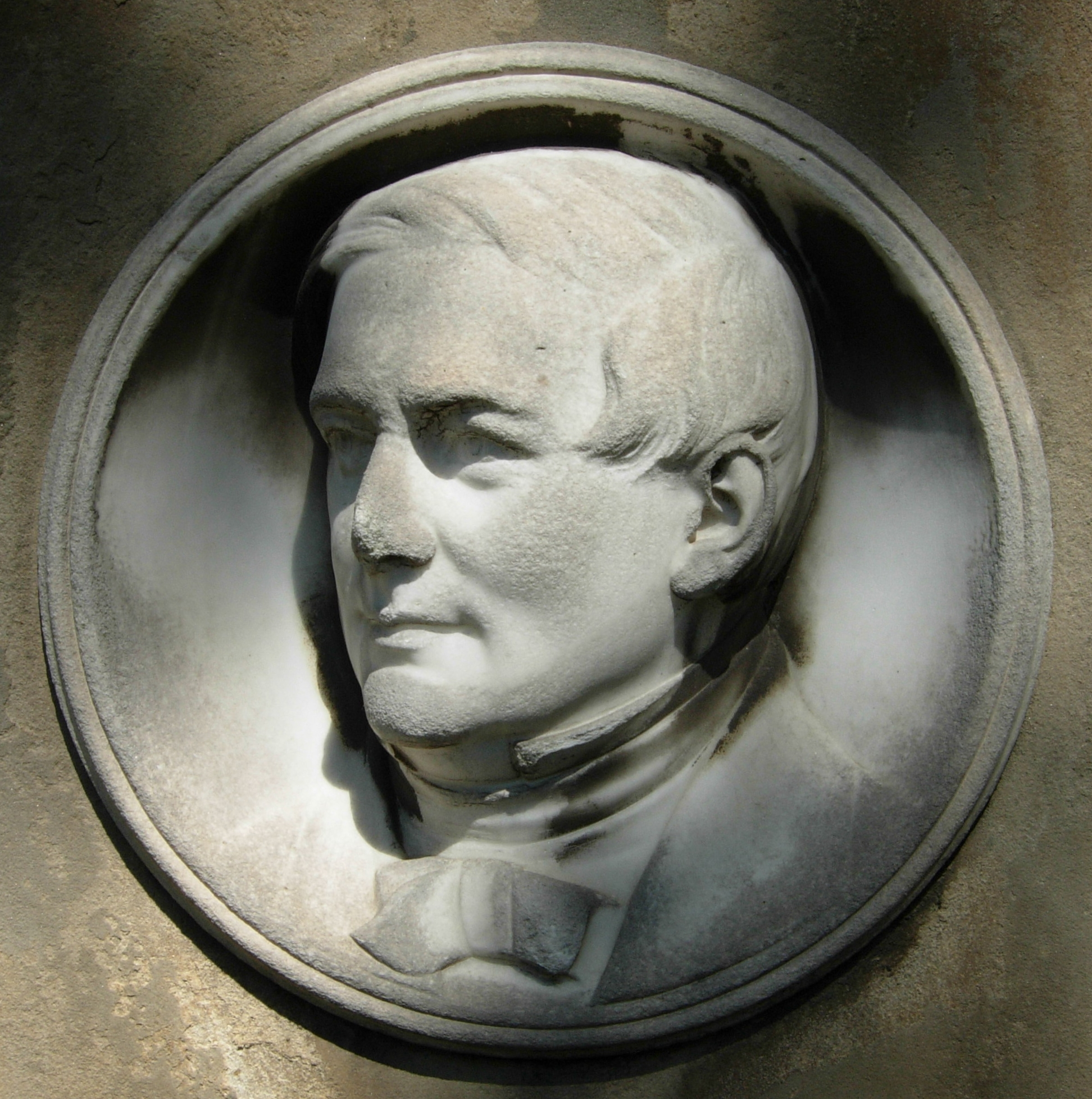
Portrayal in marble by Albert Küppers, at the Alter Friedhof, Bonn

Heinrich Carl Breidenstein (28 February 1796 – 12 July 1876) was a German musicologist. In Bonn he was university professor of musicology, and active in the musical life of the city.

== Life ==
Breidenstein was born in 1796 in Steinau an der Straße, Hesse, son of Friedrich Ernst Breidenstein, schoolteacher and organist, and his wife Juliane. He was educated at a Gymnasium in Hanau, then studied law in Berlin and later in Heidelberg, where he turned to studying philology. He became a senior teacher at the Gymnasium in Heidelberg, also joining the choral society of Anton Friedrich Justus Thibaut, a jurist and amateur musician.

Becoming interested in music through Thibaut, he gave lectures in Cologne from 1821 to 1823 on his system of harmony, described in an article in the Allgemeine Leipziger Musikzeitung: "Breidenstein pursued, in a clever presentation, a path not trodden before. He explains his system through the basic doctrines of philosophy and through the appearance of life and nature, and makes one understandable and clear by means of the other...." In 1821 he graduated at Giessen with a dissertation "On the beautiful in music".

In 1822 Breidenstein was appointed university music director at Bonn, where he was a lecturer, and from 1826 professor of musicology; it was the first time in the modern history of German universities that a chair of musicology was created. His lectures covered the history, theory, aesthetics and psychology of music.

He was active, as organizer and conductor, in the musical life of Bonn, founding an orchestra and choral society. The Beethoven Monument in Bonn, unveiled in 1845, was his suggestion.

Breidenstein died in Bonn in 1876.
