= Wilhelm Neuland =

German musician and composer

Wilhelm Neuland (14 July 1806 – 28 December 1889) was a German musician and composer of the Romantic era, with activities mainly in Bonn (Kingdom of Prussia), London (UK) and Calais (France).

== Life ==
Neuland was born in Bonn, the son of a tailor named Johann Caspar Neuland and his wife Catharina, née Frings. He attended a local private boys school and studied harmony and some musical instruments with Johann Gottfried Klebs as well as piano and composition with Carl David Stegmann until 1824. He spent the years until 1826 as a military band musician, performing on several instruments, retiring mainly on health grounds, and established himself as a music teacher and composer in Bonn. From 1828 to 1871, Neuland was conductor of the Société Philharmonique (an orchestra and choral society) in Calais, France, a position that he was able to pursue for some months in a year only. He also conducted frequently in neighbouring Boulogne-sur-Mer.

In addition, Neuland spent the years 1830 to 1835 mainly in London, where he was much in demand as a guitarist and composer for the guitar, following his contacts with other German-speaking guitarist-composers from Germany and Austria, including Ferdinand Pelzer and Leonhard Schulz. In London, he began to give opus numbers to his compositions. He wrote several ambitious works for guitar and a number of duos for guitar and piano and songs to guitar accompaniment. After he had left London, he never wrote for solo guitar again.

At the time of the inauguration of the Beethoven monument in Bonn in 1845, Neuland was back in his native city, playing cello in the orchestra during the unveiling ceremony and donating 32 thalers. Dividing his time between Calais and Bonn, Neuland composed two large masses, Opp. 30 (1840) and 40 (1856), which are now regarded as his main achievements.

After the Franco-Prussian War and the establishment of the German Empire in 1871, Neuland settled permanently in Bonn, although he maintained good relations to the north of France, attending a performance of his two masses in Boulogne-sur-Mer in 1872. He was frequently in demand as a conductor of orchestral and choral concerts, but did not have an employment as such. He died in Bonn in 1889 and was buried on the Alter Friedhof ('Old Cemetery').

== Music ==
Neuland wrote in a Romantic style following the models of Schumann and Hiller in particular. His early works for guitar established his name in England and make him one of the first composers writing music for guitar without primarily being a guitarist themselves. The masses have been performed frequently, mainly in Germany and France, until well into the twentieth century. In recent years his songs and his guitar works have created some renewed interest.

== Selected compositions ==
Guitar solo

- Air tyrolienne (c.1830)
- Six Divertissements, Op. 4 (c.1830)
- Fantaisie, Op. 5 (c.1830)
- Rondo alla tedesca, Op. 18 (1834)

Two guitars

- Six Divertissements, Op. 6 (1831)
- Andantino et rondo, Op. 8 (c.1832)
- Introduction and Variations on a Favorite Waltz by Himmel, Op. 16 (1834)

Guitar and piano

- Airs arranged as Duets, Op. 10 (1833)
- Huit Duos sur des motifs favoris et choisis (1834)
- Souvenir Germanique. Fantaisie, Op. 29 (c.1844)

Other chamber music

- Ouverture de l'opéra de Boieldieu "Le Calife de Bagdad", Op. 1 (late 1820s) for flute, viola, guitar
- Introduction et air, Op. 14 (1835) for cello and piano
- Quatuor, Op. 48 (1868) for violin, viola, cello, piano

Piano

- Erinnerung an London, Op. 17 (1834) for piano 4-hands
- Trois Polonaises, Op. 20 (publ. c.1844) for piano 4-hands
- Le Pensées. 6 Valses brillantes, Op. 23
- Le Sylphe. Impromptu, Op. 24
- Grande valse brillante, Op. 31 (c.1848)
- Souvenir de Bonn et de ses environs. 6 Valses brillantes, Op. 34 (1852) for piano 4-hands
- Le Jet de perles. Grande polka, Op. 36 (1854)
- Trois Rêveries caractéristiques, Op. 37 (1853)
- Cortège solennel au Château de Stolzenfels, Op. 51 (1876)
- Marche nuptiale, Op. 55 (1886)
- Grande polonaise, Op. 56 (1887)

Songs

- Ein Liederkranz von Florus gewunden in Bonn und Umgebung (1829), for voice and guitar
- The White Cliffs of England (George Linley) (1833), for voice and piano
- The Old Kirk Yard (Thomas Haynes Bayly) (1835), for voice and guitar
- Amour et crainte. Romance (Pierre Hédouin) (c.1835), for voice and piano
- Dernier chant d'une jeune fille. Mélodie (Pierre Hédouin) (1842), for voice and piano
- Der Weiberfeind (1845), for voice and guitar
- Songs and Legends of the Rhine, Op. 35 (Eleanor Darby), for voice and piano
- Wiederkehr (Adelheid von Stolterfoth) (1845), for voice and piano
- Le Première hirondelle. Mélodie (Émile Barateau) (1854)

Choral

- Messe solennelle No. 1, Op. 30 (1840; publ. 1844) for soloists, mixed chorus and orchestra
- Tantum ergo, Op. 33 (publ. 1851) for chorus and orchestra
- Messe solennelle No. 2, Op. 40 (1856) for soloists, mixed chorus and orchestra
- Deux Motets au Saint Sacrement, Op. 42 (publ. 1863) for three-part choir a capella
- Tantum ergo, Op. 44 for chorus and organ
