= Wilhelm Kolle =

German bacteriologist (1868–1935)

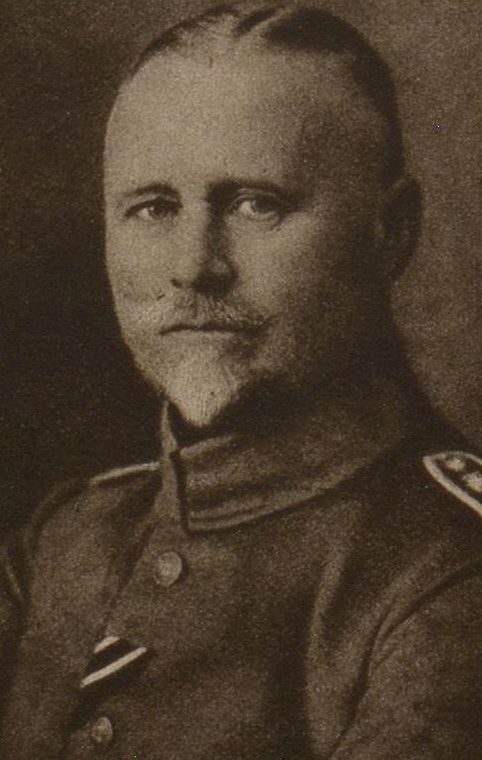
Portrait photo of Wilhelm Kolle.

Wilhelm Kolle (born 2 November 1868 in Lerbach near Osterode am Harz, died 10 May 1935) was a German bacteriologist and hygienist. He served as the second director of the Royal Institute for Experimental Therapy, succeeding its founder, the Nobel laureate Paul Ehrlich. He was also the original author, with Heinrich Hetsch, of the famous book Experimental Bacteriology, one of the most authoritative works in microbiology in the first half of the 20th century.

Following studies of medicine at the universities of Göttingen, Halle and Würzburg, he became an assistant to Robert Koch at the Institut für Infektionskrankheiten (Institute for Infectious Diseases) in Berlin (1893–97). In 1897–98 he performed research of rinderpest and leprosy in South Africa, and in 1900, on behalf of the Egyptian government, studied rinderpest in Sudan.

In 1901 he became departmental head at the Institut für Infektionskrankheiten, followed by an appointment as professor of hygiene and bacteriology at the University of Bern (1906). As a military physician and hygienist during World War I, he was highly successful in vaccination against diphtheria and cholera. In 1917, he became director of the Royal Institute for Experimental Therapy and of the Georg Speyer House in Frankfurt am Main.

Kolle made numerous contributions in the fields of serology, microbiology and chemotherapy. He is credited with the development of an anti-meningococcus serum, as well as a vaccine against rinderpest. He introduced an improved Salvarsan preparation for treatment of syphilis, and in 1896 developed a heat-inactivated cholera vaccine that was used extensively during the 20th century.

He was the father of the painter Helmut Kolle (1899–1931).

== Selected works ==
- Handbuch der pathogenen Mikroorganismen – with August von Wassermann (1866-1925); Jena, 1902-1909, Fischer, Jena, 1902-1904 (Vol. 1-4), 1907-1909 (2 supplementary volumes). The third edition (1928-1931) published by Kolle, Rudolf Kraus and Paul Uhlenhuth - (Manual of pathogenic microorganisms).
- Lehrbuch der klinischen Untersuchungsmethoden... – with Albert Eulenburg (1840-1917) and Wilhelm Weintraud (1866-1920) / Berlin : Urban et Schwarzenberg, 1904-1905 - (Textbook of clinical research methods).
- Die experimentelle Bakteriologie und die Infektionskrankheiten mit besonderer Berücksichtigung der Immunitätslehre : ein Lehrbuch für Studierende, Ärzte und Medizinalbeamte (with Heinrich Hetsch) / Berlin : Urban und Schwarzenberg, 1906 – (Experimental bacteriology and infectious diseases with particular reference to the immunity doctrine : a textbook for students, doctors and medical officials).
