= Chabeřice =

- Municipality
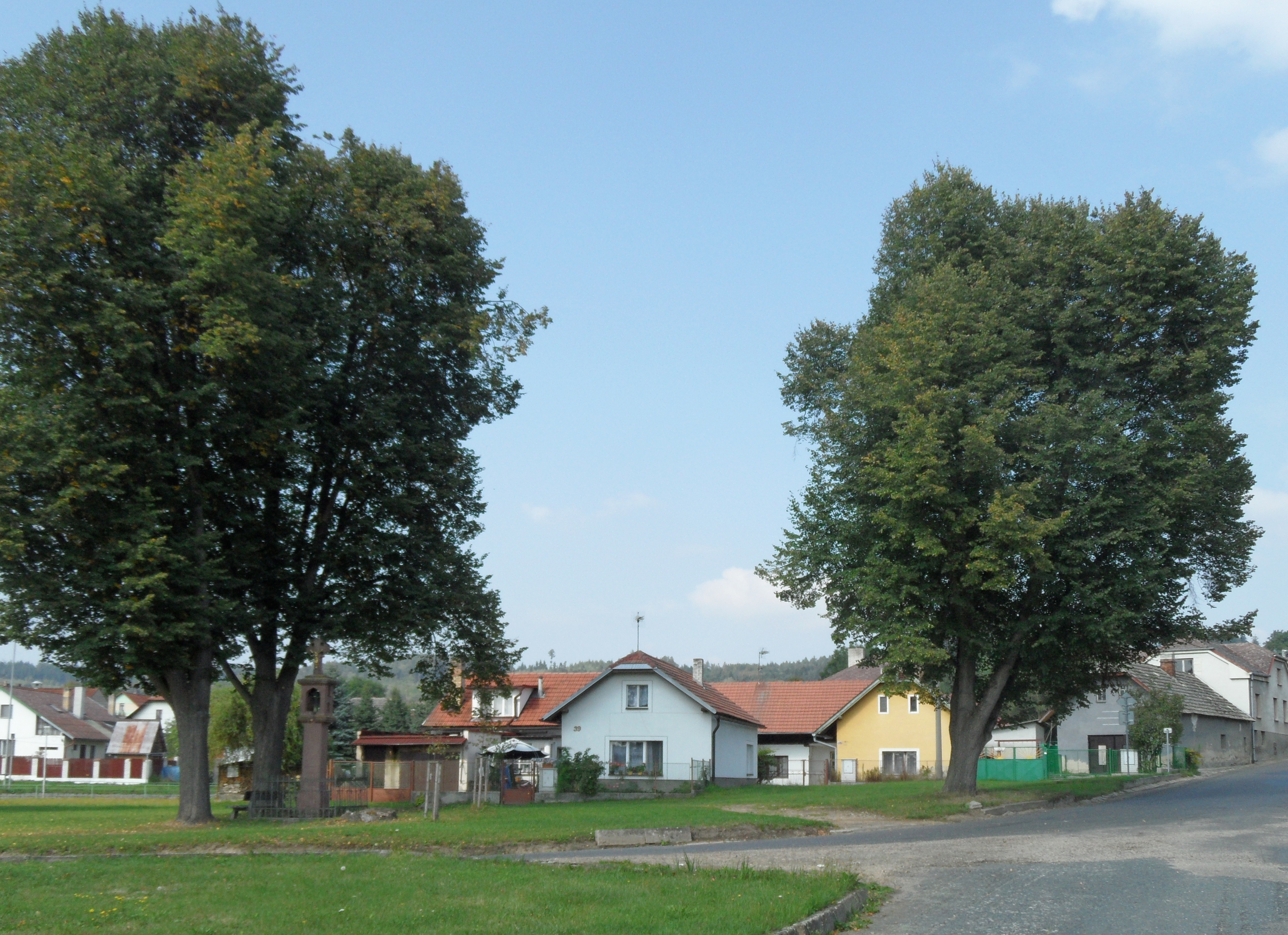
- Centre of Chabeřice

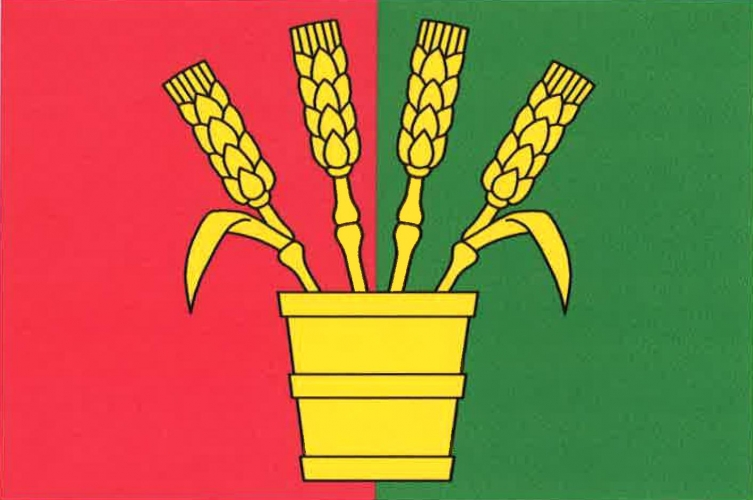
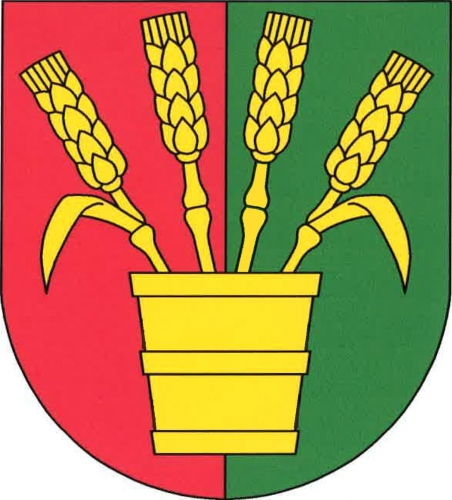
- Flag Coat of arms

- Location in the Czech Republic
- Coordinates: 49°45′0″N 15°4′26″E
- Country: Czech Republic
- Region: Central Bohemian
- District: Kutná Hora
- First mentioned: 1092

Area
  - Total: 7.95 km^{2} (3.07 sq mi)
- Elevation: 361 m (1,184 ft)

Population (2026-01-01)
  - Total: 284
  - Density: 35.7/km^{2} (92.5/sq mi)
- Time zone: UTC+1 (CET)
  - Summer (DST): UTC+2 (CEST)
- Postal code: 285 22
- Website: www.chaberice.cz

Chabeřice is a municipality and village in Kutná Hora District in the Central Bohemian Region of the Czech Republic. It has about 300 inhabitants.

== Administrative division ==
Chabeřice consists of four municipal parts (in brackets population according to the 2021 census):

- Chabeřice (144)
- Brandýs (9)
- Čížov (18)
- Holšice (69)

== History ==
The first written mention of Chabeřice is from 1092.

== Demographics ==
Historical population
Year	Pop.	±%
1869	681	—
1880	734	+7.8%
1890	707	−3.7%
1900	683	−3.4%
1910	619	−9.4%
1921	595	−3.9%
1930	539	−9.4%
1950	445	−17.4%
1961	463	+4.0%
1970	400	−13.6%
1980	334	−16.5%
1991	254	−24.0%
2001	263	+3.5%
2011	243	−7.6%
2021	240	−1.2%
Source: Censuses
