= Brandys =

Brandys is a surname. Notable people with the surname include:

- Anatoly Brandys (1923–1988), Soviet pilot
- Kazimierz Brandys (1916–2000), Polish novelist, essayist and screenwriter
- Marian Brandys (1912–1998), Polish writer
- Pascal Brandys (born 1958), French engineer

== See also ==
- Halina Mikołajska, married Halina Mikołajska-Brandys (1925–1989), Polish actress
- Brandis (surname)
- Brandeis
