= Heinrich Hetsch =

German physician and microbiologist

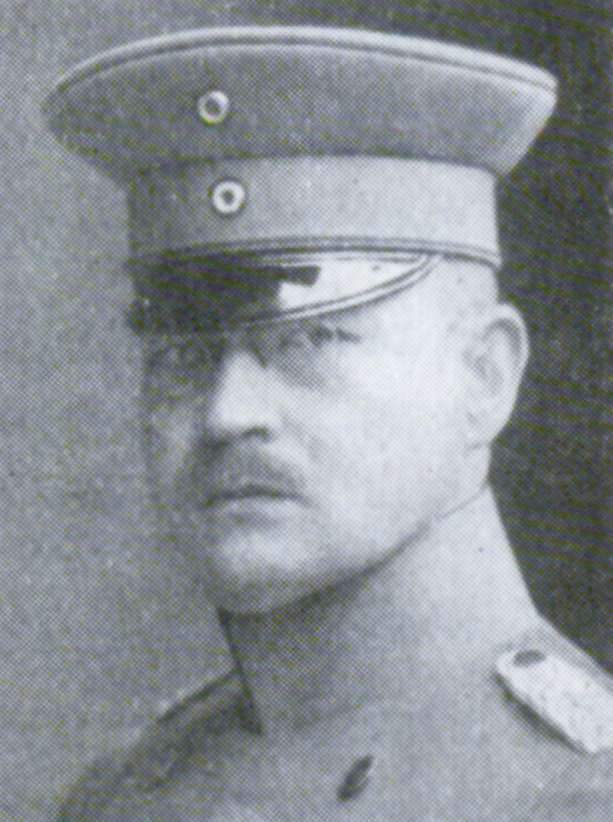
- Born: 2 July 1873
- Died: 3 December 1947 (aged 74)
- Education: Pépinière
- Occupations: physician, microbiologist
- Known for: military physician and advisor
- Notable work: Experimental Bacteriology

Heinrich Hetsch (2 July 1873, Mainz – 3 December 1947, Bad Homburg) was a German physician and microbiologist. He is known as the original author, with Wilhelm Kolle, of the famous book Experimental Bacteriology, one of the most authoritative works in microbiology in the first half of the 20th century.

He studied medicine at the German military medical school Pépinière, and graduated as a physician and obtained a research doctorate (Dr.med.) in 1895. He subsequently worked as a military physician, reaching the rank of Generaloberarzt, including as a researcher at the Robert Koch Institute for Infectious Diseases in Berlin (1902–1905) and as an adviser on hygiene and epidemiology at the Prussian Ministry of War. He obtained the Habilitation in 1914 at Leibniz University Hannover and became a Professor in 1916. From 1920 he worked at the National Institute for Experimental Therapy as a researcher and head of department. His research focused on many areas of microbiology, particularly immunology. He was noted especially for his research on cholera and typhus vaccines.
