= Ludwig Clamor Marquart =

German pharmacist and entrepreneur (1804–1881)

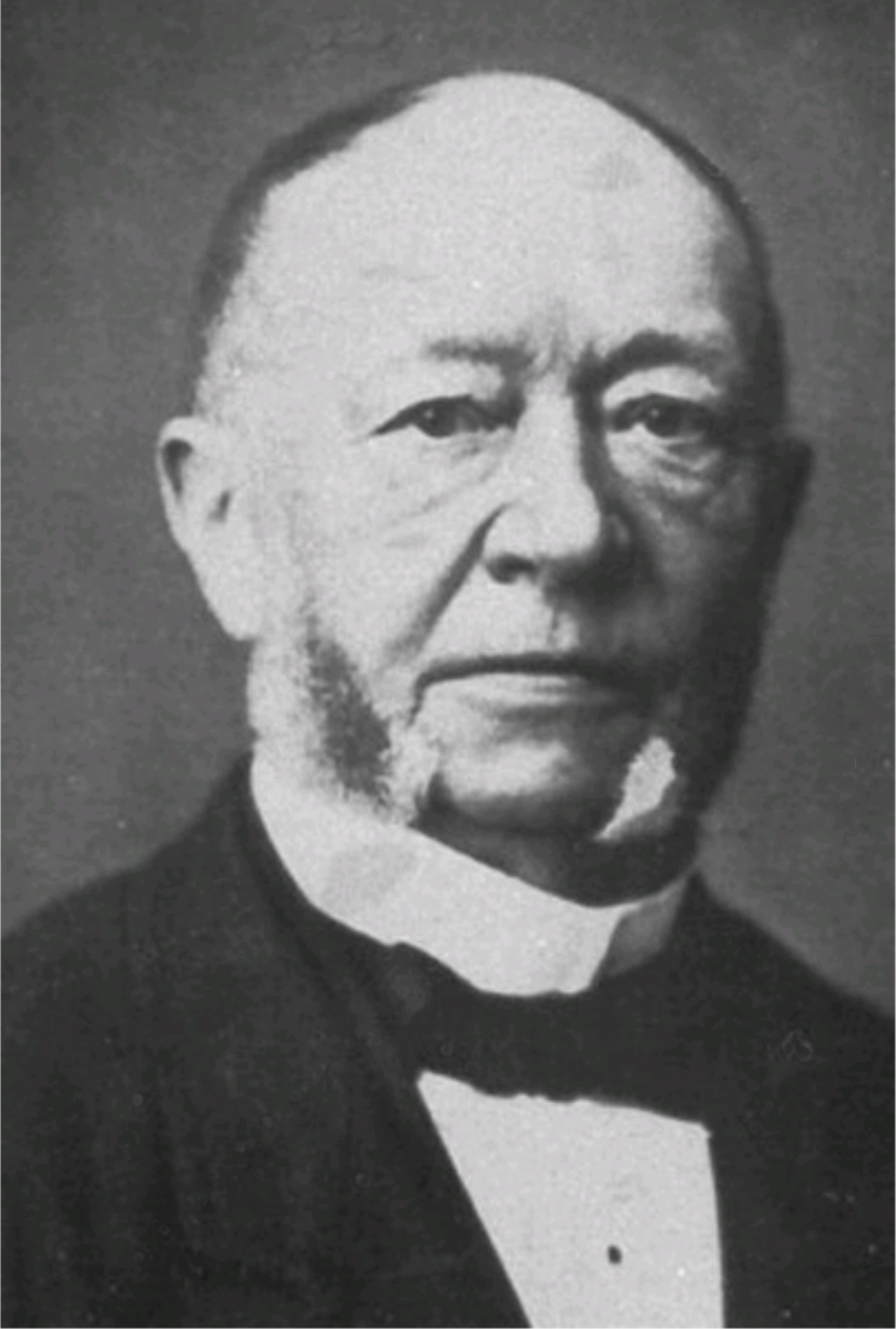
Ludwig Clamor Marquart (c. 1862)

Ludwig Clamor Marquart (29 March 1804 – 10 May 1881) was a German pharmacist and entrepreneur born in Osnabrück.

As a teenager, he was a pharmacist's apprentice in the town of Dissen, and afterwards an assistant pharmacist in Lingen and Werden. Later he was an overseer of pharmacies in the district of Cologne, and in 1835 received a doctorate in pharmaceutical chemistry from the University of Heidelberg. In 1837 he started a private pharmaceutical institute in Bonn, where he taught classes until 1845. One of his students at the institute was renowned chemist Remigius Fresenius (1818-1897).

In 1845 he founded in Bonn, Marquart's Lager chemischer Utensilien, a factory that produced fine chemicals and pharmaceuticals. Today the operation in Bonn is part of Evonik; thus making it one of the oldest producers of chemicals in Germany.

In 1835 Marquart is credited for coining the chemical term "anthocyanin" to denote the blue pigment of the cornflower. In 1842, Justus Carl Hasskarl named the genus Marquartia (family Pandanaceae) in his honor.
