= Quercus brandisiana =

Conservation status
- Least Concern (IUCN 3.1)

Scientific classification
- Kingdom: Plantae
- Clade: Embryophytes
- Clade: Tracheophytes
- Clade: Spermatophytes
- Clade: Angiosperms
- Clade: Eudicots
- Clade: Rosids
- Order: Fagales
- Family: Fagaceae
- Genus: Quercus
- Subgenus: Quercus subg. Cerris
- Section: Quercus sect. Cyclobalanopsis
- Species: Q. brandisiana

Binomial name
- Quercus brandisiana Kurz

Synonyms
- Cyclobalanopsis brandisiana (Kurz) Schottky

Species of flowering plant

Quercus brandisiana is a species of oak in the family Fagaceae. It is native to Bangladesh, Myanmar, Thailand and Laos. It is in the subgenus Cerris, section Cyclobalanopsis. In upland forests it is often the dominant species.
