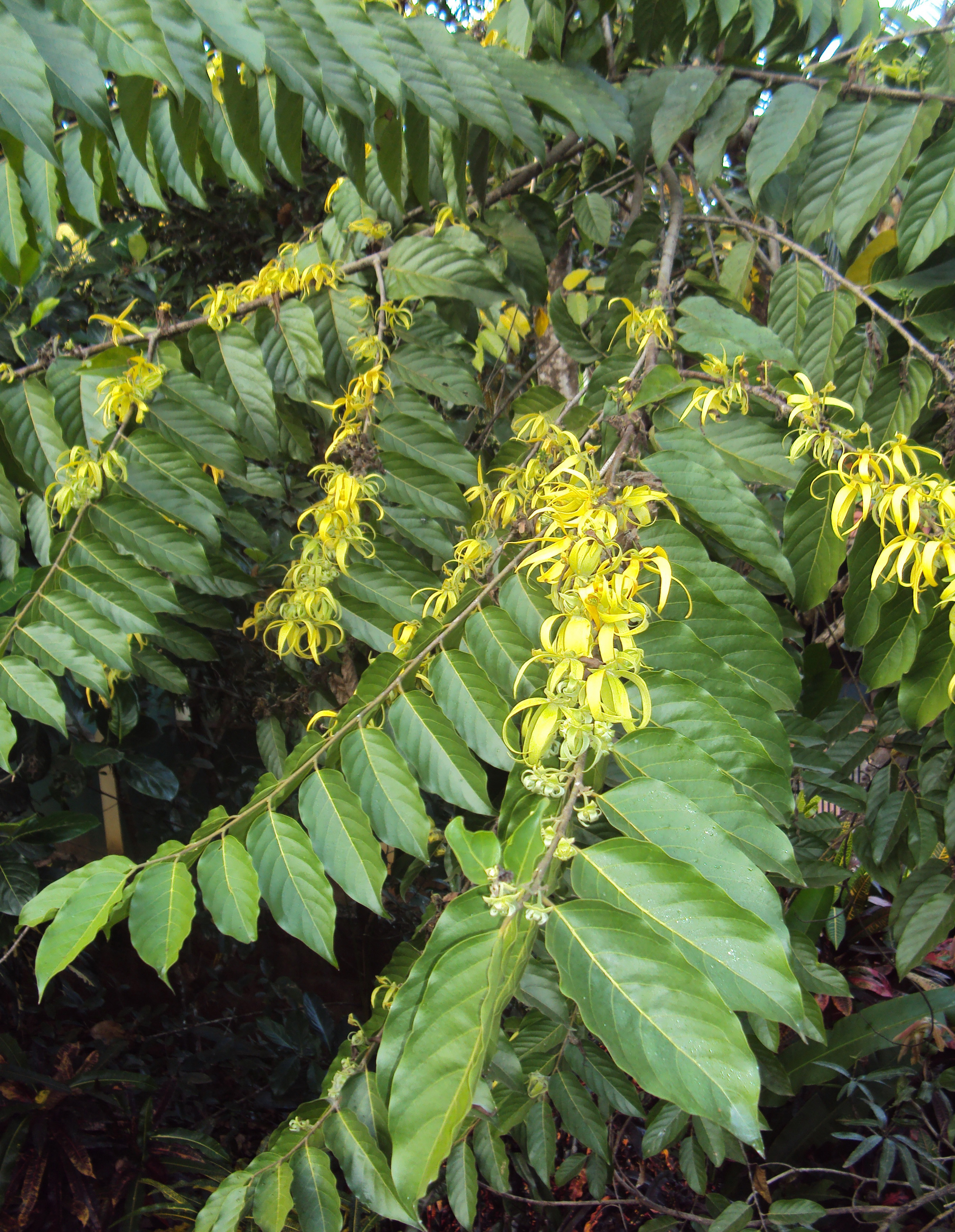
- Cananga odorata, leaves and flowers

Scientific classification
- Kingdom: Plantae
- Clade: Tracheophytes
- Clade: Angiosperms
- Clade: Magnoliids
- Order: Magnoliales
- Family: Annonaceae
- Subfamily: Ambavioideae
- Genus: Cananga (Dunal) Hook.f. & Thomson, nom. cons.

Synonyms
- Canangium (Baill.) King; Fitzgeraldia F.Muell.

= Cananga =

Genus of flowering plants

Cananga (ultimately from Proto-Malayo-Polynesian *kanaŋa) is a small genus of only two species in the custard apple family Annonaceae, native to areas from Indo-China through Malesia to Australia. One of the species, Cananga odorata, is the source of the fragrant oil ylang-ylang.

== Species ==
Two species are recognized:

- Cananga brandisiana (Pierre) Saff., syn. Cananga latifolia (Hook.f. & Thomson) Finet & Gagnep.
- Cananga odorata (Lam.) Hook.f. & Thomson
