= Brandeis =

Brandeis is a German surname derived from one of the Czech towns named Brandýs (Brandýs nad Labem and Brandýs nad Orlicí) that are called Brandeis in German. The Czech form of the surname in Brandejs. Notable people with the surname include:

- Antonietta Brandeis (1848–1926), Czech-born Italian painter
- Friedl Dicker-Brandeis (1898–1944), Austrian artist, designer and educator
- Gayle Brandeis (born 1968), American novelist
- Irma Brandeis (1905–1990), American scholar
- Louis Brandeis (1856–1941), American lawyer and Supreme Court Justice

== See also ==
- Brandeis Marshall, American data scientist
- Brandys (disambiguation)
- Brandis (surname)
- Brandes (disambiguation)
