= Oberveterinärrat =

Oberveterinärrat (senior veterinary councillor) was a title conferred upon veterinarians in Germany. It formed part of the 5th Rangklasse of civil servants (Beamten), and ranked just below Geheimer Veterinärrat (equivalent to Geheimrat, i.e. Privy Councillor), and above Veterinärrat. The title was also used in the German Democratic Republic as an honorary title for veterinarians who had distinguished themselves.
