= Marthe Brandès =

French actress (1862–1930)

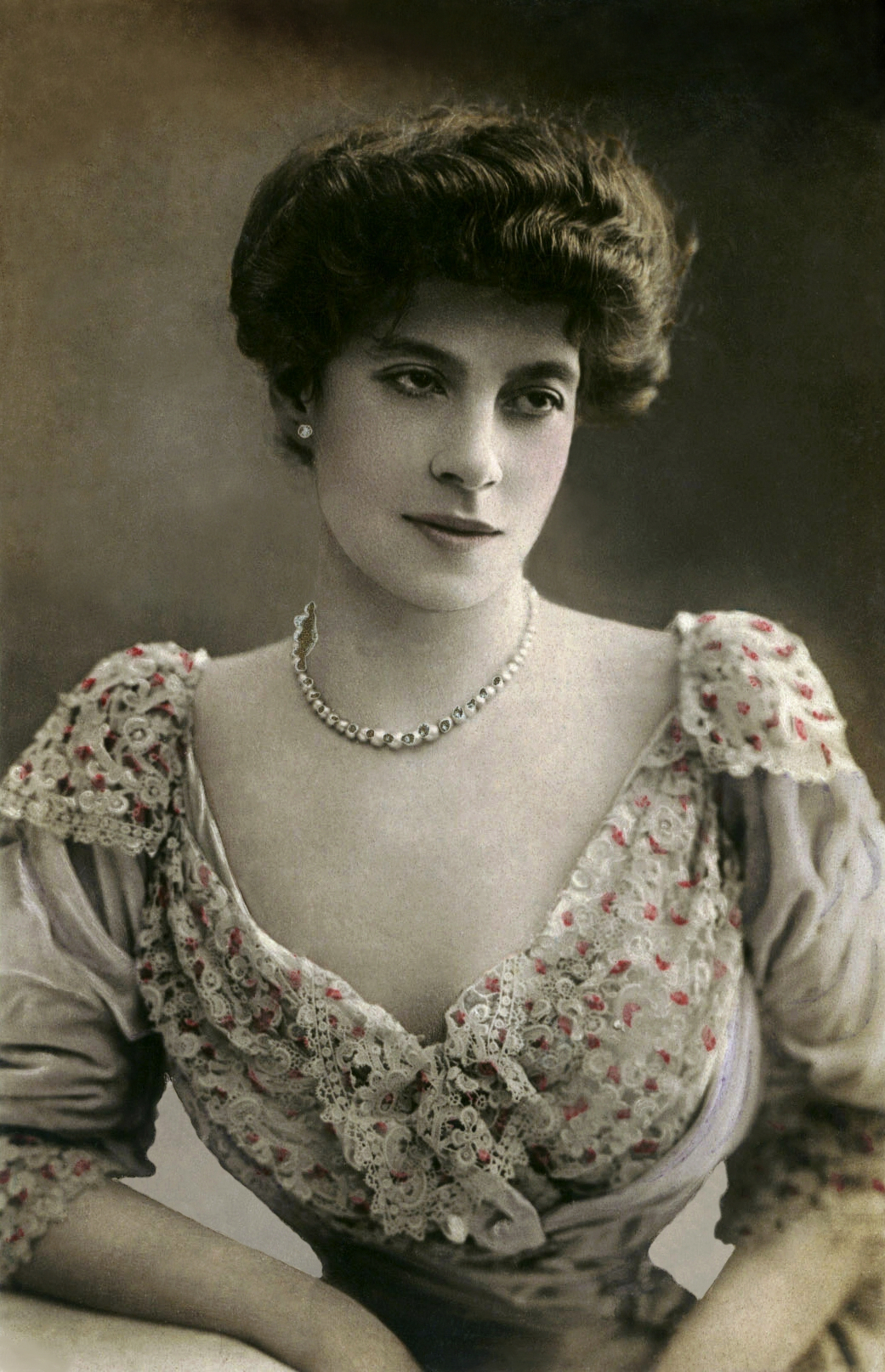
- Photograph of Brandès before 1900
- Born: Marthe Joséphine Brunschwig; 31 January 1862
- Died: 26 April 1930 (aged 68)
- Occupation: Actress

Marthe Brandès, née Marthe Josephine Brunschwig (31 January 1862 – 26 April 1930), was a French stage actress. In 1884, she won the first prize for comedy at the Paris Conservatoire, and she debuted in Françillon by Alexandre Dumas at the Comédie-Française three years later. She left the Comédie-Française in 1903 and had to pay damages for breaking her contract. In 1920, she won the French Legion of Honour. "Private sorrow and a long illness" ultimately caused her to leave the theater later in life. After her death in 1930, Philip Carr of The New York Times memorialized her as an actress on par with Jeanne Julia Bartet and almost at the same level as Sarah Bernhardt and Gabrielle Réjane, calling her one of the "four queens of the Paris stage" from 1896 to 1906.
