= Dietrich Brandis =

German botanist and forester (1824–1907)

Sir Dietrich Brandis KCIE, FRS
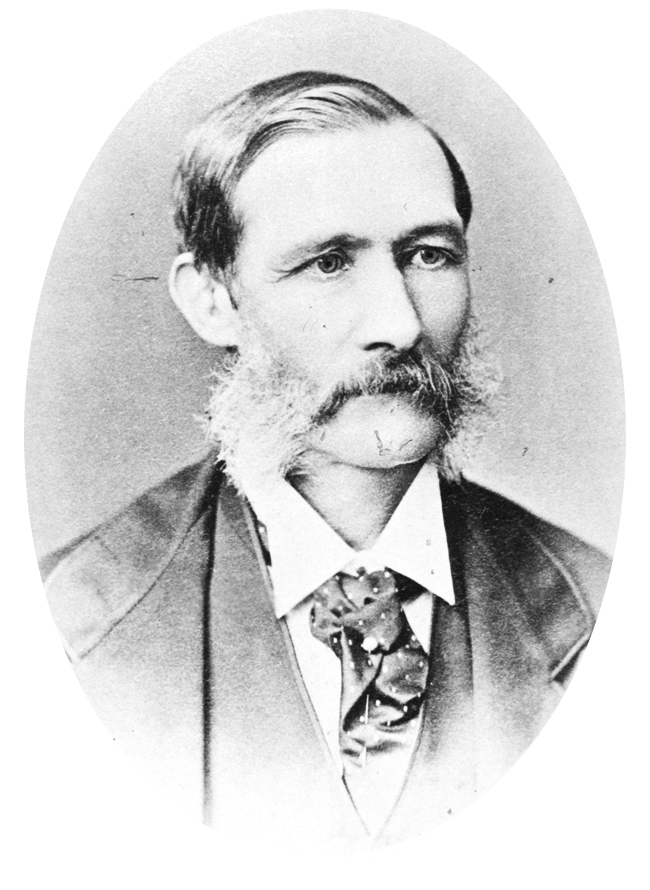
- Born: 31 March 1824; Bonn, Germany
- Died: 29 May 1907 (aged 83); Bonn
- Occupations: Botanist, forestry academic, civil servant
- Scientific career
- Author abbrev. (botany): Brandis

Sir Dietrich Brandis KCIE FRS (31 March 1824 – 28 May 1907) was a German-British botanist and forestry academic and administrator, who worked with the British Imperial Forestry Service in colonial India for nearly 30 years. He joined the British civil service in Burma in 1856, shortly afterwards became head of the British forestry administration in all of Burma, and served as Inspector General of Forests in India from 1864 to 1883. He returned to Europe in 1883, dividing his time between Bonn and Greater London. In retirement he dedicated himself to scholarly work, resulting in the book Indian Trees (1906), his magnum opus. Brandis is considered the father of tropical forestry and has also been described as the father of scientific forestry. In addition to his work in India, he also had a significant influence on forest management in the United States.

== Early life, education and family ==
A member of the patrician Brandis family, Dietrich Brandis was born in Bonn, Germany, and was the son of the prominent philosopher Christian August Brandis, who was tutor to the young King Otho of Greece and Professor of Philosophy at the University of Bonn. His grandfather Joachim Dietrich Brandis was personal physician to Queen Marie of Denmark and Norway and a member of the Royal Danish Academy of Sciences and Letters.

He studied at the universities of Copenhagen Biology, Göttingen Botany and Bonn Biology major and minor Geography and Antiquites, and in 1849, he took up a post as a lecturer in botany at Bonn. His interest in forest management was initially from a botanical perspective.

In 1854, he married Rachel Marshman, a daughter of the Indian scholar and missionary Joshua Marshman and a sister of the wife of General Havelock. His brother-in-law Havelock was a friend of Lord Dalhousie, the Governor-General of India, and it was this connection that brought him to Burma and eventually India. His first wife died in India in 1862, and during a two-year sabbatical in Europe from 1865 to 1867, he met and married Katharina Hasse, eighteen years his junior. She moved to India with him and the couple had six children, some of whom did not reach adulthood.

Dietrich Brandis was the father of supreme court justice Bernhard Brandis and the grandfather of the microbiologist Henning Brandis.

== Forestry administrator in British India ==
Among other natural resources, the British government in India was interested in the use of forest produce. The felling of trees was unregulated, and between 1847 and 1850 the British government started to realize that the forests in India were being lost. In 1850, the British Association in Edinburgh formed a committee to study forest destruction at the behest of Hugh Cleghorn. In 1855, Lord Dalhousie, the Governor-General of India issued a Memorandum of the Government of India. This was based on reports submitted by John McClelland, then Superintendent of Forests in Burma, at the time part of the British India.

=== Burma ===
Brandis joined the British civil service in 1856 as superintendent of the teak forests of Pegu division in eastern Burma. In 1858 he became head of the imperial forest administration of all of British Burma.

During that time Burma's teak forests were controlled by militant Karen tribals. He introduced the "taungya" system, in which Karen villagers provided labour for clearing, planting and weeding teak plantations. In return, they were allowed to plant crops for the first few years between the trees. As the teak trees grew, villagers were moved to new land and the process was repeated. As a result of this process, many villagers became dependent on the state forestry service and local resistance to the state takeover of forests became increasingly difficult.

Based on his academic training, Brandis was initially interested in botany. His herbarium and botanical library, which he shipped from Calcutta to Rangoon, were lost when the boat carrying it capsized. This loss led him to shift his focus from botanical studies to forestry.

Brandis' work included the determination of teak volume, rate of growth, identifying rate of harvest, developing forest protection plans against pests and fire. He also introduced timber purchase rules, clearing rules and the establishment of managed teak areas called conservancies with officers who were appointed as Conservators. Based on his experience, he helped formulate the Indian Forest Act of 1865.

== Contribution to forestry management in India ==
In 1864 Brandis became Inspector General of Forests in India, a position he served in for 20 years. He formulated new forest legislation and helped establish research and training institutions. The Imperial Forest School at Dehradun was founded by him. Brandis was created a Companion of the Indian Empire in 1878, and he became a Knight Commander of the same order in 1887.

Brandis documented the sacred groves in Rajputana and Kans (woodlands) of Mysore, the Garo and Khasia hills, which he visited in 1879, the Devarakadus of Coorg in 1868, the hill ranges of the Salem district in the Madras Presidency in 1882, the Swami Shola on the Yelagiris, the sacred grove at Pudur on the Javadis and several sacred forests on the Shevaroys. He was among the earliest in India to formally link forest protection with local peoples.

He also took an interest in the forest flora of northwest and central India and of Indian trees in general. Even after retirement, Brandis continued to work on Indian forestry and, at the age of 75, he started his principal botanical work, Indian Trees, dealing with 4400 species. It was first published in 1906 and re-issued several times afterwards, the last time in 1971. He was posted at Balaghat in M.P. as a principal of forester training institute for a long time in his service period.

== Retirement ==
After his retirement from the position as Inspector General of Forests in India in 1883, he returned to Bonn, but frequently visited England in the following years. From 1900 until 1906 he lived permanently in Kew in Greater London. He also supervised training of forestry students at the Royal Indian Engineering College in England for eight years (1888–1896). His interest in American affairs led him to take special care of American foresters visiting Europe, for which he received a personal letter of thanks by President Theodore Roosevelt in 1904. He was succeeded as Inspector General of Forests by Lt Col Frederick Bailey of the Royal Engineers.

Shortly after returning to Bonn in late 1906, he was hospitalized and died a few months later on 28 May 1907.

== Broader influence ==
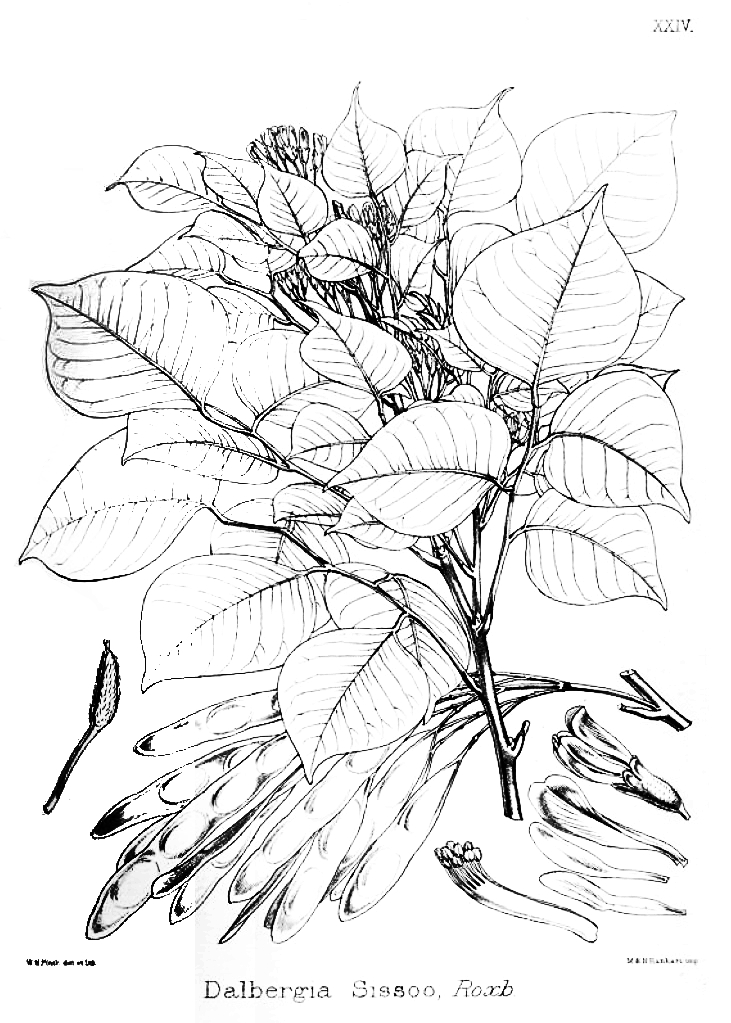
Dalbergia sissoo from "Illustrations of the Forest Flora of North-West and Central India"

Brandis was also involved in forestry education in England at Coopers' Hill. He also influenced and mentored many like Berthold Ribbentrop, W. Schlich and C.A. Schenck of Germany (while a visiting professor at the University of Giessen), and Gifford Pinchot and Henry Graves (the first and second chiefs of the USDA Forest Service) of the United States.

He influenced the forestry movement in the United States by mentoring Pinchot, Graves, and others who came to study with him in Germany, and through his voluminous correspondence with many other men, such as Charles Sprague Sargent and Franklin Hough involved in establishing the U.S. national forest system. Pinchot relied heavily upon Brandis' advice for introducing professional forest management in the U.S. and on how to structure the Forest Service in 1905. His influence was so great that President Roosevelt sent him a photograph in 1896 with the inscription

"To Sir Dietrich Brandis, in high appreciation of his services to forestry in the United States. From Theodore Roosevelt."

== Honours ==
- Honorary member of the Royal Scottish Arboricultural Society, 1874
- Fellow of the Royal Society, 1875
- Companion of the Order of the Indian Empire, 1878
- Knight Commander of the Order of the Indian Empire, 1887
- The honorary title Professor awarded by the Prussian Minister for Agriculture and Forestry, 1893
- Doctor honoris causa of law, University of Edinburgh, 1898
- Honorary member of the Society of American Foresters, 1904

== Legacy ==
Many species of plants are named after him:

- Cananga brandisiana (Pierre) Saff.
- Dendrocalamus brandisii (Munro) Kurz
- Diospyros brandisiana Kurz
- Ochlandra brandisii Gamble
- Macaranga brandisii King
- Millettia brandisiana Kurz
- Orophea brandisii Hook.f. & Thomson
- Quercus brandisiana Kurz
- Ardisia brandisiana Kurz
- Iodes brandisii Kurz
- Ixora brandisiana Kurz
- Loranthus brandisanus Kurz
- The genus Brandisia Hook.f. & Thomson is also named after him.
