= Brandeis Award =

Brandeis Award may refer to:

- Brandeis Award (privacy)
- Brandeis Award (Zionism)
- Brandeis Award (litigation), from Federal Trade Commission
