= Raymond S. Brandes =

Californian archeologist and historian (1924–2014)

- Born: January 2, 1924; San Diego, California, U.S.
- Died: April 16, 2014 (aged 90); San Diego, California, U.S.
- Education: University of Arizona (B.A., Ph.D.)
- Occupations: Archeologist and historian
- Military career
- Allegiance: United States
- Branch: United States Army
- Service years: 1940s
- Known for: Archaeology and history of the American West; San Diego historian
- Conflict: World War II
- Other work: Director, Arizona Historical Society; Assistant Director, San Diego Historical Society

Raymond S. Brandes (January 2, 1924 – April 16, 2014) was an American archeologist and historian. His work focused specifically on the American West as well as on his hometown of San Diego.

== Early life and education ==
Brandes was born in San Diego, California, on January 2, 1924 to Theodore Brandes and Mary Peters. He served in the United States Army for six years during World War II.

Brandes received both his bachelor's degree and his Ph.D. from the University of Arizona. During his time as a student, his aunt, niece, and first wife were killed by a drunk driver, leaving Brandes and his infant daughter as the sole survivors.

== Career ==
After his service, he worked for the National Park Service's Southwestern Monuments Headquarters. While working for the National Park Service, Brandes conducted an archeological survey of the San Carlos Indian Reservation, during which he excavated one of the earliest Hohokam ball courts, built in approximately 700–1200 AD. During his time as a student at the University of Arizona, Brandes became director of the Arizona Historical Society as well as the state of Arizona's second state historian.

Brandes was editor of the journal Arizoniana, a historical journal published by the Arizona Pioneers' Historical Society, from 1961 to 1964. In 1964, he became Assistant Director of the San Diego Historical Society.

== Death ==
Brandes died of natural causes at his San Diego home on April 16, 2014. He was 90 years old.
