= Anatoly Brandys =

Ukrainian Ilyushin Il-2

Anatoly Yakovlevich Brandys
- Russian: Анатолий Яковлевич Брандыс; Ukrainian: Анатолій Якович Брандис
- Born: 12 August 1923; Dnipro, Ukrainian SSR
- Died: 23 March 1988 (aged 64); Moscow, Soviet Union
- Military career
- Allegiance: Soviet Union
- Branch: Soviet Air Force
- Service years: 1941–1986
- Rank: Lieutenant General
- Unit: 75th Guards Ground Attack Aviation Regiment
- Conflicts: World War II
- Awards: Hero of the Soviet Union (twice)

Anatoly Yakovlevich Brandys (Russian: Анатолий Яковлевич Брандыс, Ukrainian: Анатолій Якович Брандис; 12 August 1923 – 23 March 1988) was a Soviet Ilyushin Il-2 ground attack pilot during World War II who was twice awarded the title Hero of the Soviet Union. After the war, he remained in the Air Force and became a lieutenant-general.

== Early life ==
Brandys was born on 12 August 1923 to a Latvian family of miners in the village of Nizhnedneprovsk, situated in an area presently in the Amur-Nyzhnodniprovskyi District within the city of Yekaterinoslav (now Dnipro), Ukrainian SSR, Soviet Union. As a child he was very athletic and engaged in a variety of sports; he went on to attend the local aeroclub and the Dnipropetrovsk Special Air Force School, both of which he graduated from in 1941 shortly before entering the military in June. In December that year in completed training at the Dnipropetrovsk Military Aviation School of Initial Pilot Training. In 1942 he became a member of the communist party, but it was not until August 1943 that he was deployed to the warfront, since graduated from the Molotov Military School of Pilots in July. Before deployment he was briefly assigned to the 10th Reserve Aviation Regiment stationed in Penza.

== World War II ==
Upon arriving at the warfront in August 1943 he became a pilot in the 75th Guards Attack Aviation Regiment. After flying 128 missions on the Il-2 he was nominated on 29 August 1944 for the title Hero of the Soviet Union, which was awarded on 23 February 1945. He was again nominated for the title on 16 April 1945 when he totaled 217 missions, and he received the second gold start on 29 June 1945. By the end of the war he had flown 218 sorties, during which he took out 11 artillery batteries, 20 anti-aircraft artillery points, 8 aircraft on the ground, 20 railway cars, as well as several tanks. Often he flew with Abdykasym Karymshakov as his gunner, who flew 227 sorties and became a full bearer of the Order of Glory. Throughout the war he flew in a variety of combat operations including the battles for Donbas, Crimea, Minsk, Vitebsk, Vilnius, and Königsberg. Despite being in combat for less than two years and entering the regiment as a regular pilot, Brandys quickly rose through the ranks to the position of squadron commander with the rank of captain.

== Postwar ==
Brandys remained in the 75th Regiment until February 1946, and then by then the unit began using the Il-10. After leaving the regiment he began his studies at the Air Force Academy, which he graduated from in 1950. He then was made deputy commander of the 723rd Attack Aviation Regiment, which he was promoted to commander of in March 1952. In 1955 he was transferred to commander the 339th Attack Aviation Division, which was later converted to a bomber and fighter division. After graduating from the Military Academy of General Staff in 1959 he was made commander of the 135th Guards Fighter-Bomber Division, and in 1960 he was placed in command of the 149th Fighter-Bomber Division. From June 1962 until February 1964 he was in charge of the Central Aeroclub named after V.P. Chkalov in Tushino. He then began working at the Military Academy named after M.V.Frunze, where he started out as a lecturer and eventually became the senior lecturer of the Air Force department; in 1967 he became a Candidate of Military Sciences. For two years he served as a military specialist in Egypt until 1975, after which he began work at the Military Academy of General Staff. That year he was promoted to the rank of General-Major of Aviation, after which he received several promotions at the academy until retiring in 1986, just one year after he was promoted to lieutenant-general. During his career he flew the Il-10, MiG-15, MiG-17, and Su-7. He died on 23 March 1988 in Moscow and was buried in the Kuntsevo cemetery.

== Awards and honors ==
- Twice Hero of the Soviet Union (23 February 1945 and 29 June 1945)
- Order of Lenin (23 February 1945)
- Four Order of the Red Banner (1 November 1943, 23 February 1944, 5 November 1944, and 19 April 1945)
- Order of Alexander Nevsky (27 August 1944)
- Two Order of the Patriotic War 1st class (3 May 1944 and 11 March 1985)
- Order of the Red Star (30 December 1956)
- campaign, service, and jubilee medals
