= Bernhard Schmidt (microbiologist) =

German microbiologist

Bernhard Schmidt (born 20 May 1906 in Magdeburg, died 23 September 2003 in Esslingen am Neckar) was a German microbiologist. He was professor and director of the Institute for Infection Control and Medical Microbiology at the Free University of Berlin.

Schmidt studied chemistry and medicine at the Ludwig-Maximilians-Universität München, and graduated as a physician and earned a doctoral degree in 1932. He undertook residency training in infection control and bacteriology, and earned his Habilitation at the University of Göttingen in 1939. He worked at the Institute for Medical Microbiology and Infection Control at the Goethe University Frankfurt from 1946, and became an adjunct full professor (Außerplanmäßiger Professor) at the Goethe University Frankfurt in 1948.

In 1953, he became Professor Ordinarius of Infection Control and Director of the Institute for Infection Control and Medical Microbiology at the Free University of Berlin. He was additionally director of the Medizinaluntersuchungsamt in Berlin-Wedding. He became professor emeritus in 1974.

== Honours ==
- Hygieia Medal, 1978

== Selected works ==
- Die hygienische Bedeutung der zentralen und lokalen Versorgungsanlagen (Lebensmittelversorgung, Wasser, Abwasser, Gas, Elektrizität) im Frieden und im Kriege, 1938
- Die Ernährung des deutschen Volkes unter besonderer Berücksüchtigung der Ernährung seines Heeres, E.S. Mittler, 1939
- Hygienische Gesichtspunkte beim Bau und bei der Einrichtung von Krankenhäusern, 1958
