= Joachim Dietrich Brandis =

German-Danish physician (1762–1845)

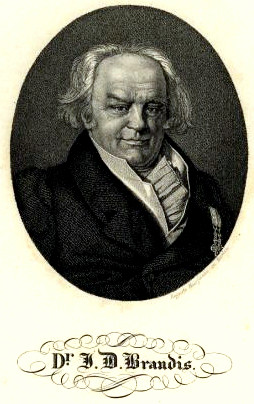
Joachim Dietrich Brandis

Joachim Dietrich Brandis (also Dietrich Joachim Friedrich Brandis) (born 18 March 1762 in Hildesheim, died 28 April 1845 in Copenhagen) was a German-Danish medical doctor.

== Family ==
He was a son of the judge Christian Dietrich Brandis (1722–1800), and belonged to a prominent family from Hildesheim. He was the father of the philosopher Christian August Brandis and the grandfather of the forestry academic and administrator in India Sir Dietrich Brandis.

== Career ==
He studied medicine in Göttingen, earned a doctorate in 1785 and a Habilitation in Brunswick in 1791. In the following years he practised as a physician in the Duchy of Brunswick-Lüneburg. In 1803 he became Professor of Medicine at the University of Kiel, and in 1807 he founded a hospital in Kiel.

After saving the life of the wife of the Danish statesman Christian von Bernstorff, he earned great authority and respect at the Danish royal court, and moved permanently to Copenhagen in 1810. In Denmark he became personal physician to Queen Marie of Denmark and Norway, and he also lectured at the University of Copenhagen. He received the title etatsraad (councillor of state) in 1811 and the title konferensraad (privy councillor) in 1828. He also became a member of the Royal Danish Academy of Sciences and Letters in 1819 and of the Royal Swedish Academy of Sciences in 1831.

== Works ==
- Bibliothecæ medicinæ practicæ: qua scripta ad partem medicinæ practicam; 1776, with Albrecht von Haller and Tribolet
- Joachimi Diederici Brandis ... Commentatio de oleorum unguinosorum natura, etc; 1785
- Translation: Versuch einer Naturgeschichte von Chili: Mit einer Landcharte; 1786, by Johann Ignatz Molina
- Bemerkungen auf einer Reise durch die Pfälzischen und Zweybrückschen Quecksilber-Bergwerke; 1788, with Franz Cölestin von Beroldingen
- Anleitung zum Gebrauche des Driburger Bades und Brunnens nebst einer kurzen Beschreibung der dortigen Anlagen und Gegend; 1792
- Chirurgische und physiologische Versuche; 1795, with John Abernethy and Karl Gottlob Kühn
- Johann Abernetty's Chirurgische und physiologische Versuche: Uebers. und mit einigen Anm. begleitet von Joachim Diterich Brandis; 1795
- Versuche über die Lebenskraft 1795
- Versuche über die Metastasen
- Erfahrungen über die Wirkung der Eisenmittel im allgemeinen und des Driburger Wassers insbesondere; 1803
- Pathologie; 1808
- Pathologie oder Lehre von den Affekten des lebendigen Organismus, 1815
- Ueber psychische Heilmittel und Magnetismus; 1818 (Online)
- Erfahrungen über die Anwendung der Kälte in Krankheiten; 1833 (nicht frei von aprioristischer Ueberschwänglichkeit)
- Zoonomie oder Gesetze des organischen Lebens: Welcher die Artikel des Arzneyvorraths und eine Untersuchung über die Würkung der Arzneymittel enthält; 1801, with Erasmus Darwin
- Ueber humanes Leben; 1825
- Ueber den Unterschied zwischen epidemischen und ansteckenden Fiebern; 1831
- Ueber Leben und Polarität; 1836
- Nosologie und Therapie der Cachexien; 1839
