= Urban & Schwarzenberg =

German academic publishing company

- Parent company: Verlagsgruppe Georg von Holtzbrinck
- Founded: 1866
- Defunct: 1998
- Successor: Urban & Fischer
- Country of origin: Germany
- Headquarters location: Munich
- Publication types: Books
- Nonfiction topics: medical literature

Urban & Schwarzenberg was a German academic publishing company, specializing in medical literature. It was founded as a book store in 1866 in Vienna. It acquired the Wiener Medizinische Presse in 1876, marking the start of Urban & Schwarzenberg as a medical publisher. In 1898, the company opened an office in Berlin, which soon after became its new head office. The company relocated to Munich in 1949.

Urban & Schwarzenberg was acquired by the American company Waverly (parent of Williams & Wilkins) in 1990. Urban & Schwarzenberg was acquired by Verlagsgruppe Georg von Holtzbrinck in 1998. In 1999, it was merged with another publishing house owned by Georg von Holtzbrinck, and became Urban & Fischer. In 2003, Urban & Fischer was acquired by Elsevier.

== Literature ==
- Hundert Jahre Urban & Schwarzenberg. 1866–1966, Munich, 1966
