= Immunobiology (journal) =

Journal

- Discipline: Immunology
- Language: English

Publication details
- History: 1908-present

Standard abbreviations
- ISO 4: Immunobiology

Immunobiology is a peer-reviewed medical journal covering immunology, published by Elsevier. It was established in 1908 as the Zeitschrift für Immunitätsforschung and renamed Immunobiology in 1980. According to the Journal Citation Reports, the journal has a 2013 impact factor of 3.180.
