= Katharina Brandis =

German artist

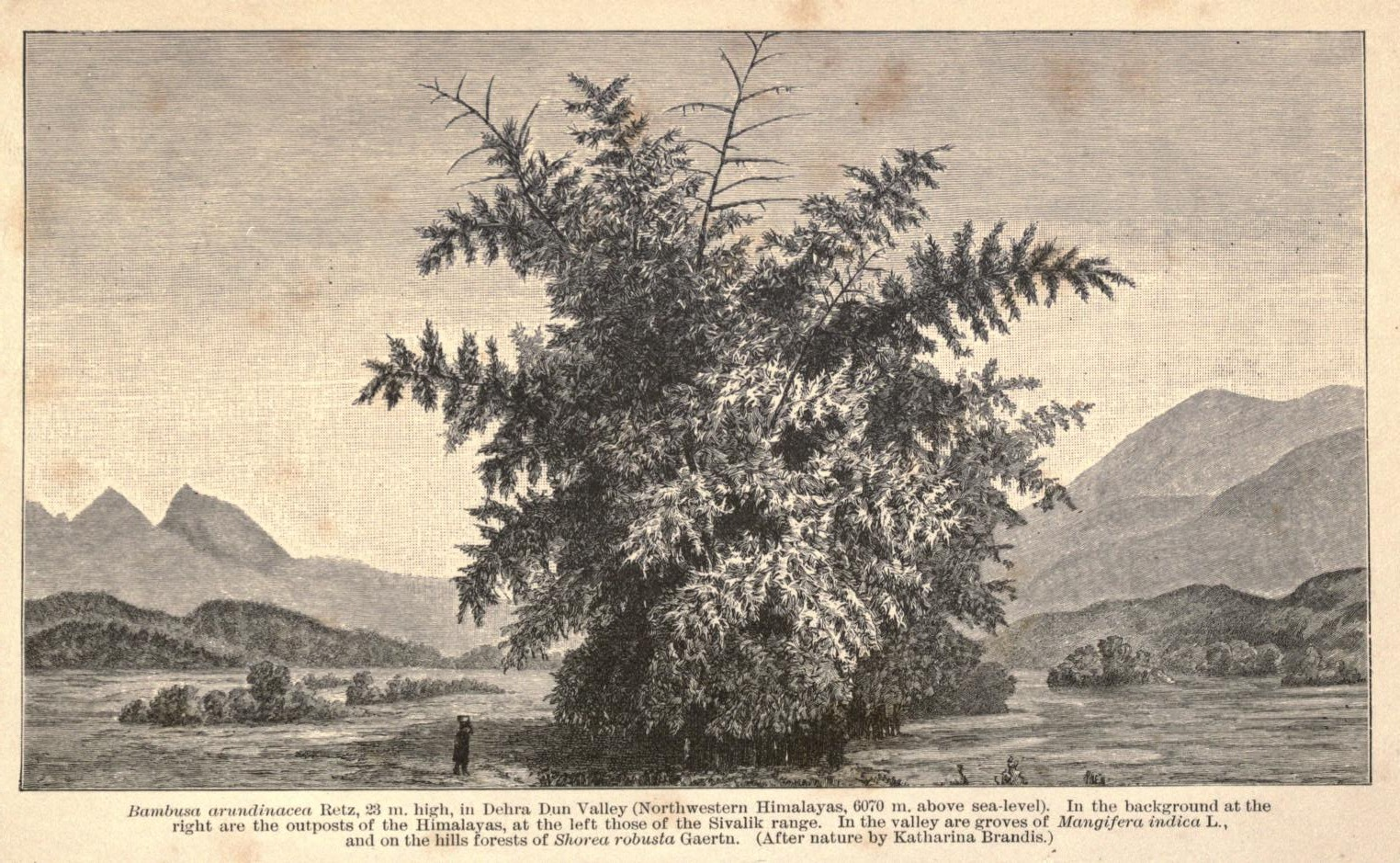
Frontispiece showing Bambusa arundinacea drawn from nature by Lady Brandis for Eduard Hackel's 1890 book on grasses. (The altitude mentioned in the caption is in error, it is about 607 m above sea level)

Lady Katharina Brandis née Hasse (June 18, 1841 – November 14, 1928) was a German artist. She married (later Sir) Dietrich Brandis, inspector general of forests in India, and lived in British India for several years. Living mainly in Shimla and Dehradun, she painted plants and landscapes from the Himalayas in watercolour.

Katharina was born in Greifswald, the daughter of theology professor at the University of Bonn, Friedrich Rudolf Hasse and his wife Cäcilie née Poelchau. She received private tuitions and took drawing lessons from Christian Hohe. In 1866 she met the widowed Dietrich Brandis who was in Europe on vacation and married him the next year in Bonn. They travelled to London and then to Bonn, Paris and Marseille before taking a ship to Bombay. She spent some time in Agra while her husband went to Calcutta. In May they moved to their home in Shimla. From 1868 to 1869 she travelled through Kangra, Lahore, Sind and Delhi. Another daughter Cecilia was born in Shimla. In 1871 her husband took leave to Europe due to sickness and at Brindisi, she too fell seriously ill. Her second child Joachim was born in Bonn and she fell ill again but recovered slowly. The family moved to Richmond in 1872 where another daughter Caroline was born in 1873 and in the same year Cecilia died from scarlet fever. They returned to India in 1874, leaving the children in Europe with relatives. They lived in Dehradun where another son, Bernhard Friedrich was born in 1875. In 1877 she had Maria Dorothea who suffered from poor health from the age of two. They then took her to Europe but she died en route at sea. The family returned to Shimla in 1879 and she travelled with her husband to Burma. In 1880 they had a sixth child, Martin Gerhard in Shimla. After retirement and knighthood in 1883 her husband moved back and the couple lived in Bonn spending some time also at Kew Gardens. She was buried next to her husband in the Old Cemetery at Bonn. Only Bernhard survived her.

An exhibition of her paintings was held in Bonn City Museum in 2010–11. A biography was written by Ursula Brandis, widow of Katharina's grandson Henning Brandis.
