= Christian August Brandis =

German historian (1790–1867)

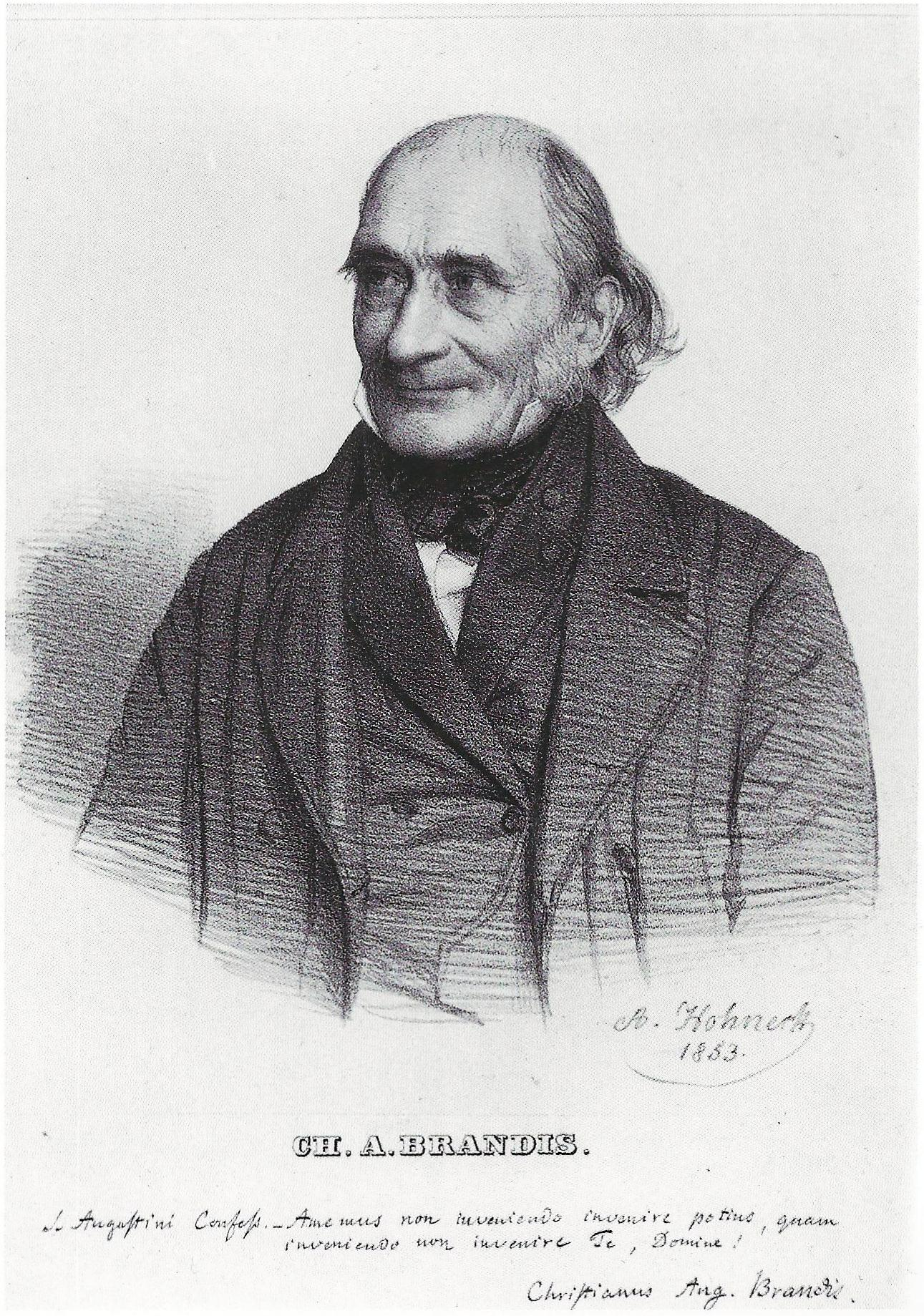
Christian August Brandis

Christian August Brandis (13 February 1790 – 21 July 1867) was a German philologist and historian of philosophy.

== Biography ==
Brandis was born in Hildesheim, and was the son of the physician Joachim Dietrich Brandis. His father moved to Copenhagen in 1810, where he became personal physician to Queen Marie.

He was educated at Kiel University. In 1812 he graduated at Copenhagen, with a thesis Commentationes Eleaticae (a collection of fragments from Xenophanes, Parmenides and Melissus). For a time he studied at Göttingen, and in 1815 presented as his inaugural dissertation at Berlin his essay Von dem Begriff der Geschichte der Philosophie.

In 1816 he refused an extraordinary professorship at Heidelberg in order to accompany BG Niebuhr to Italy as secretary to the Prussian embassy. Subsequently, he assisted Immanuel Bekker in the preparation of his edition of Aristotle. In 1821 he became professor of philosophy in the newly founded University of Bonn, and in 1823 published his Aristotelius et Theophrasti Metaphysica. With Böckh and Niebuhr he edited the Rheinisches Museum, to which he contributed important articles on Socrates (1827, 1829). From 1836 to 1839 he was tutor to the young King Otto of Greece. Brandis was elected a member of the American Antiquarian Society in 1839.

His great work, the Handbuch der Geschichte der Griechisch-Römischen Philosophie (1835-1866; republished in a smaller and more systematic form, Geschichte der Entwicklungen der griechischen Philosophie und ihrer Nachwirkungen im römischen Reiche, 1862-1866), is characterized by sound criticism.

Brandis died in Bonn.

He was the father of the forestry academic and administrator Sir Dietrich Brandis.
