= Index of forestry articles =

Articles on forestry topics include:.

== A ==
Afforestation - Aldo Leopold - Analog forestry - Ancient woodland - Angle gauge - Appalachian balds - Arboriculture - Arborist - Forestry in Argentina - Assarting

== B ==
Backpacking (hiking) - Forestry in Bangladesh - Bernard Fernow - Forestry in Bhutan - Biltmore Forest School - Biltmore stick - Biochar - Biscuit Fire publication controversy - Bog-wood - Borderline tree - Botany - Bottomland hardwood forest - British timber trade - Buchonia - Buffer strip

== C ==
Caliper - Canopy research - Canopy walkway - Carl A. Schenck - Cellulosic ethanol - Certified wood - Forestry in Chad - Charcoal - Clearcutting - Clinometer - CODIT - Community forestry - Conservation biology - Coppicing - Cork - Creosote - Cultigen - Cultivar - Cultblock

== D ==
Deforestation - Deforestation during the Roman period - Dendrochronology - Desertification - Diameter tape - Drunken trees

== E ==
Ecoforestry - Ecological succession - Ecological thinning - Ecological yield - Eloise Gerry - Energy forestry - Forestry in Ethiopia - Exploration Logging - Extended rotation forest

== F ==
Faustmann's Formula - Firewood - Forbidden Forest - Forest dwellers - Forest fire - Forest farming, the ecosystem approach to forest management - Forest fragmentation - Forest governance - Forest history - Forest interpretation - Forest management - Forest policy - Forest politics - Forest Principles - Forest produce - Forest protection - Forest ranger - Forest transition - Forester - Forestry - Forestry agencies - Forestry education - Forestry journals

== G ==
Georg Ludwig Hartig - Forestry in Ghana - Gifford Pinchot - Girard form class - Girdling - Green Chain

== H ==
Hand compass - Hardwood timber production - Hemispherical photography - Hendre-Dru Tramway - High forest (woodland) - High grading - Historic schools of forestry - Historical Logging Switchback Railway in Vychylovka - History of the New York State College of Forestry - Franklin B. Hough - Hotshot crew - Hydro axe mulching

== I ==
Illegal logging - Increment borer - Independent Forest Monitoring - Forestry in India - Interception (water) - International Society of Tropical Foresters - International Year of Forests

== J ==
Forestry in Japan - Jewish National Fund - Joint Forest Management - Journals

== K ==
Károly Bund - Kerry Tramway - Krummholz

== L ==
Forestry in Laos - Leaf Area Index - Limbing - Line plot survey - Living stump - Log bridge - Log bucking - Log driver - Log scaler - Logging - Lumber - Lumberjack - Lumberjack sports - Lumberjack World Championship

== M ==
Management of Pacific Northwest riparian forests - Mean annual increment - Micropropagation - Multiple Use - Sustained Yield Act of 1960

== N ==
Nalini Nadkarni - New York State College of Forestry - New Zealand Journal of Forestry - Non-timber forest product - Northwest Forest Plan

== O ==
Old growth forest - Optimal rotation age

== P ==
Pacing - Paper - Patch cut - Periodic annual increment - Pollarding - Pruning - Pulp and paper industry - Pulp and paper industry in Canada - Pulp and paper industry in Europe - Pulp and paper industry in Japan - Pulp and paper industry in the United States - Pulpwood

== R ==
Rainforest - Reducing emissions from deforestation and forest degradation - Reforestation - Relascope - Research institutes - Restoration ecology - Riparian buffer - Robert Marshall - Royal Saxon Academy of Forestry - Natural rubber - Rubber tapper

== S ==
Sakari Pinomäki - Salvage logging - Sawdust - Sawmill - Scleroderris canker - Secondary forest - Selection cutting - Shelterwood cutting - Short rotation coppice - Short rotation forestry - Shredding (tree pruning technique) - Silviculture - Site index - Site tree - Slash-and-char - Harry A. Slattery - Smokejumper - Snag - Softwood - Stand Density Index - Stand density management diagram - Stemflow - Stephen C. Sillett - Stihl Timbersports Series - Stump harvesting - Stumpage - Sustainable forest management - Kenneth Dupee Swan

== T ==
Tall oil - Tall Timbers Research Station and Land Conservancy - Tar - Technical schools - Thinning - Throughfall - Timber - Timber rafting - Timberjack - Timberlands West Coast Limited - Town forest - Tree - Tree inventory - Tree preservation order - Tree shelter - Tree stump - Tree taper - Treethanol - Treeplanting - Turpentine - Types of formally designated forests

== U ==
Forestry in Uganda - United Nations Forum on Forests - Universities and colleges - Urban forest - Urban forestry - Urban reforestation

== V ==
Variable retention harvesting - Veteran tree - Volume table

== W ==
Wedge prism - Whip (tree) - Wildfire - Windbreak - Windthrow - Wood - Wood chopping - Wood fuel - Wood management - Wood pellet - Wood processing - Woodchipping in New Zealand - Woodland management - Woodlot - Woodsman - Theodore Salisbury Woolsey, Jr. - World forestry - World Logging Championship

== Z ==
Raphael Zon
