= Site index =

Site index is a term used in forestry to describe the potential for forest trees to grow at a particular location or "site". Site is defined as "The average height of dominant and/or codominant trees of an even-aged, undisturbed site of intolerant trees at a base age"; furthermore, the word site is used in forestry to refer to a distinct area where trees are found. Site index is used to measure the productivity of the site and the management options for that site and reports the height of dominant and co-dominant trees in a stand at a base age such as 25, 50 and 100 years. For example, a red oak with an age of 50 years and a height of 70 feet (21 m) will have a site index of 70. Site index is species specific. Common methods used to determine site index are based on tree height, plant composition and the use of soil maps.

== Determining site index ==
The most common of the methods used to determine site index is tree height. Determining site index is achieved by measuring and averaging the total height and age of trees found on that site. Height is obtained from a site tree, usually a dominant or co-dominant tree (referred to as canopy position) in a stand and is estimated using an instrument called a clinometer, or measured using a laser hypsometer or releskop. Age is calculated using an instrument called an increment borer or from planting records for even aged stands. These values are then used on a graph or an equation called a site index curve.

Determining site index from plant composition is often referred to as the indicator-plant approach. Site index is determined from plant composition by the presence, abundance, and size of understory plants. Understory plants are especially useful if they are only found in specific areas.

In the United States, site index can be determined from soil maps provided by the Natural Resources Conservation Service (NRCS). Soil surveys were conducted by the NRCS and site index was measured for these soils. Tables were compiled of the relationships between different soils and different site indexes for important species of that area.

Direct methods of creating a site index include estimation from historical yield records, stand volume data, growth intercepts, or height–age relationships (site index). Site index has been the most widely used means of estimating site productivity in North America, despite some shortcomings. Indirect methods include estimations based on relationships among dominant species, lesser vegetation characteristics or site indicators, as well as topographic, climatic, and edaphic factors. A generalized model using both direct and indirect variables for developing composite site index equations was presented by Payandeh and Wang (1997). The generalized model described 2 data sets better than did either a composite site index model (Payandeh 1991) or a logistic site index model, Model 3 (Monserud 1984).

== Examples ==
A tree is measured to be 60 feet (18 m) in overall height, and the stand age is determined to be 50 years old. To find site index from a site index curve, one would find age 50 along the x-axis and then find 60 feet (18 m) along the y-axis. Where these two points intersect one would find the nearest line, which represents the site index for that stand.

An example of a site index equation is: lnS=lnH_{d}-b_{1}(A^{−1}-A_{i}^{−1})

Where S is site index, A_{i} is index age, H_{d} is height of dominants and co-dominants and A is stand age. This will estimate height at index age (site index).

=== Example: White spruce ===
Characterization of site quality or productivity is important in forest management. Since it is so difficult to predict early growth rates of planted white spruce, site index curves cannot be reliably extended below about 15 years (Stiell 1976). After that, height growth can be fairly uniform until it begins to decline 25 to 35 years later, e.g., at Petawawa, where dominant height growth remained at about 30 cm per annum at age 45 to 50 years (Stiell and Berry 1973).

Among the individual white spruce within a stand, height growth varies greatly, often with a coefficient of variation in height of about 30% (Stiell 1955). Such variation may reflect differential expressions of check, variability within the seed lot, or the use of poorly graded stock (Stiell 1976). A fully stocked 30-year-old plantation of white spruce on a loamy fine sand underlain by silty clay loam in northern Michigan exemplifies both the variability in size of stem and their persistence.

Site index curves for interior spruce in British Columbia have been developed by the British Columbia Ministry of Forests Research Branch (Thrower et al. 1991, Coates et al. 1994). From measurements of 3212 individually measured spruce trees (including black spruce) in interior British Columbia, curves were drawn to define site classes at a reference age of 50 years (Hegyi et al. 1981).

The site index curves at base age 50 years for planted unthinned white spruce at Petawawa Forest Experiment Station in eastern Ontario range between 24.38 m and 15.24 m (Stiell and Berry 1973), and fall comfortably within the 30 m to 5 m range of those for interior British Columbia (Viszlai 1983, Coates et al. 1994).

== See also ==
- Forest inventory
- Stocking (forestry)
- Stand density index
