= Sexton Wood =

UK Site of Special Scientific Interest

Coordinates: 52.474°N 1.382°E

- Site of Special Scientific Interest
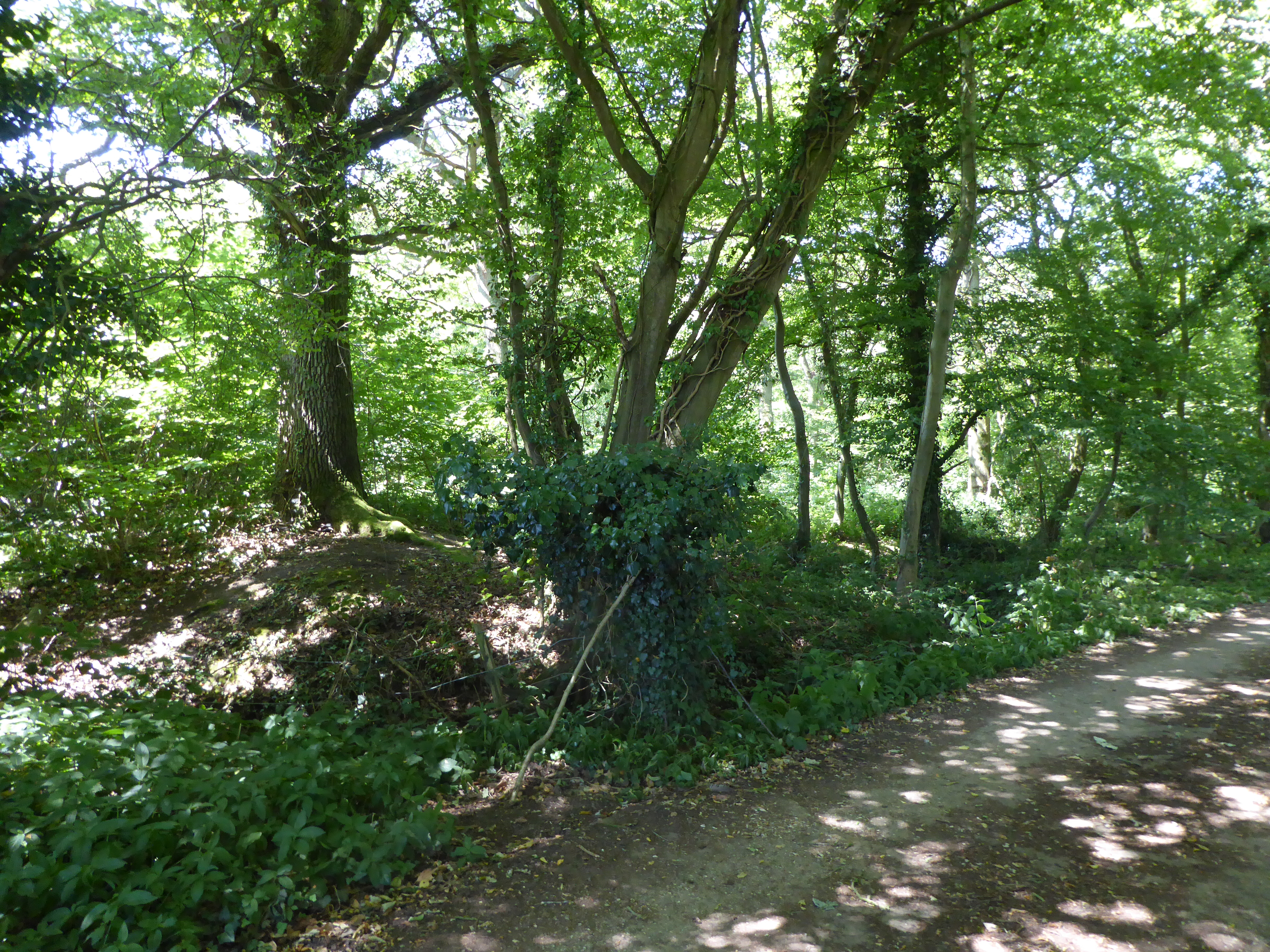
- Location of Sexton Wood.
- Area of search: Norfolk
- Grid reference: TM 298 916
- Interest: Biological
- Area: 40.0 hectares (99 acres)
- Notification date: 1983
- Location map: Magic Map

Sexton Wood is a 40-hectare (99-acre) biological Site of Special Scientific Interest north-west of Ditchingham in Norfolk, England. It is a Nature Conservation Review site, Grade 2.

This ancient wood on boulder clay is mainly coppice with standards, but there are some areas of high forest. The ground flora is diverse, with dog's mercury dominant and other plants such as ramsons and early-purple orchid.

The wood is private property with no public access.
