= Borderline tree =

Borderline tree is a term used in forestry.

It is a concept that comes from variable radius plots, or point sampling. It happens when a tree cannot be easily determined as in or out when using a prism or angle gauge. Borderline trees occur only when the distance from the sampling point to the center of the tree is equal to the DBH times plot radius factor (PRF). The PRF is determined based on the type of prism or angle gauge being used. Basal Area Factor (BAF) 5, 10, and 20 angle gauges result in PRFs of 3.89, 2.75, and 1.94 (feet inch^{−1}) respectively. The metric equivalents of these PRFs are 0.467, 0.33, and 0.233 (m cm^{−1}).

When a tree is borderline, a series of measurements and calculations must be made to determine if the tree is in or out. The horizontal distance from the sampling point to the center of the tree must be measured along with the DBH of the tree. The DBH should then be multiplied by the PRF, which will give a limiting distance. If the measured distance is less than or equal to this limiting distance, the tree is counted as in. If it is greater than the limiting distance, it is out.

== Units ==
BAF: ft^{2}/acre, (metric: m^{2}/ha)

PRF: ft/inch, (metric: m/cm)

== Formulas ==
Limiting Distance = DBH x PRF

PRF = $\sqrt{\frac{75.625}{BAF}}$, metric:$\sqrt{\frac{0.25}{BAF}}$

== Example ==
A tree that appears borderline using a BAF 10 instrument was measured as 12.4 inches (310 mm) DBH.
The horizontal distance from the sampling point to the center of the tree is 34 feet (10 m).
DBH x PRF = Limiting Distance
12.4in. x 2.75ft./in. = 34.1ft.
34.1 feet (limiting distance) is greater than 34 feet (measured distance), tree is in.
