= I-Tree =

Forestry analysis and benefits assessment tools

i-Tree is a collection of urban and rural forestry analysis and benefits assessment tools. It was designed and developed by the United States Forest Service to quantify and value ecosystem services provided by trees including pollution removal, carbon sequestration, avoided carbon emissions, avoided stormwater runoff, and more. i-Tree provides baseline data so that the growth of trees can be followed over time, and is used for planning purposes. Different tools within the i-Tree Suite use different types of inputs and provide different kinds of reports; some tools use a 'bottom up' approach based on tree inventories on the ground, while other tools use a 'top down' approach based on remote sensing data. i-Tree is peer-reviewed and has a process of ongoing collaboration to improve it.

The complete research on which i-Tree is built has been collated into a report titled "Understanding i-Tree: Summary of Programs and Methods" with the purpose of providing underlying details and limitations. Also discussed are the history, goals, and opportunities seen for the project. Originally released in 2019, updated editions were released in 2021 and 2023.

== Tools ==
There are four categories of i-Tree tools, which can enhance an individual's or organization's understanding of the benefits which trees provide in modern society. Over two decades the U.S. Forest Service has developed and refined these applications:

- Individual Trees
  - i-Tree MyTree
  - i-Tree Design
  - i-Tree Eco
- Canopy Assessment
  - i-Tree OurTrees
  - i-Tree Landscape
  - i-Tree Canopy
- Tree Planting
  - i-Tree Planting
  - i-Tree Species
  - i-Tree Stormwater
- Research (those used for research and those being researched)
  - i-Tree Hydro
  - i-Tree Cool Air
  - i-Tree Buffer
  - i-Tree Energy
  - Tree Compensation Calculator

User can expand and update the species, location, weather, and pollution datasets by making submissions to i-Tree Database.

== History ==
i-Tree began in 2002 as survey of a sample of urban forest to simulate taking a tree inventory of an entire urban forest. It then added hand held devices for efficient inventory of street trees. The current version of i-Tree includes different tools which allow for several sources of data to be used, such as land cover classification datasets, satellite imagery, and tree inventories. Some tools use continuous data on air pollution and meteorology for more accurate results.

== Research ==
Researchers using i-Tree have examined:

- The benefits of urban trees
- Selecting the best tree planting locations
- Storm damage to urban forests
- Potential bird habitats
- PM2.5 removal and health effect
