= Stand density management diagram =

A stand density management diagram is a simple biological model relating forest yield to forest density at any stage of a particular forest stand's development. Stand density management diagrams are used in forest management and designed to use a current stand's density to project its future yield. One major reason for the effectiveness of density management diagrams is the relatively low effect of site variance on the diagram's shape. Density management diagrams have transformed ideas long held in traditional stocking diagrams. In 1967, Samuel F. Gingrich published his idea of comparing basal area per acre, trees per acre, and quadratic mean diameter in one graph. He called this the stocking diagram. These same principles are used to make the stand density management diagram work. Basal area and density are plotted against one another and quadratic mean diameter lines are plotted through the plot.

The diagram itself is a plot of the natural logarithm of the volume or yield against the natural logarithm of stems per acre. Just like a stocking diagram, the A-line, B-line, and C-line are plotted. In addition, the -3/2 rule maximum density line is plotted just above the A-line. The diagram works well for even aged, single cohort stands. However, it is not as effective with uneven-aged stands.

== See also ==
- Stand Density Index
- Stand level modelling
