= Judson Freeman Clark =

Judson Freeman Clark (27 July 1870, Queens County, Prince Edward Island – 26 July 1942, Los Angeles) was a Canadian forester and mycologist. He is famous for publishing in 1906, what is now known as the International 1/8-Inch Log Rule (for 1/8-inch saw kerf), which he modified in 1917 for 1/4-inch saw kerf.

== Biography ==
After receiving a B.S. in agriculture from the University of Toronto in 1896, Clark taught English and mathematics at the Ontario Agricultural College from 1896 to 1898. In 1898 he matriculated at Cornell University, graduating there with A.M. in 1899 and Ph.D. in botany in 1901. At Cornell University, upon the resignation of Professor Filibert Roth, Clark was appointed assistant professor and, after six months' study in Germany and Switzerland, started work in January 1902. He "handled courses in timber physics, mensuration, dendrology, and silviculture."

Clark resigned in 1903 from Cornell University and worked briefly for the United States Bureau of Forestry, before he was appointed in 1904 a provincial forester in Ontario as a member of the staff of the Crown Lands Department.

Dr. Clark arrived in British Columbia in 1904, and shortly after formed the firm of Judson F. Clark & Company. In 1910 Dr. Clark contacted C. A. Lyford and P. L. Lyford, who were at that time engaged in compiling a working plan in Quebec for the Riordon Paper Company of Montreal. The Lyford brothers joined Clark, and formed the firm of Clark & Lyford Limited, of Vancouver, in 1912. Clark and the Lyford brothers were therefore the first foresters in private practice in British Columbia.

For many years he was "the senior member of the firm of consulting foresters, Clark and Lyford, Ltd., in Vancouver, British Columbia."

The firm made a specialty of timber cruising (the sampling of a stand of trees to estimate the amount of standing timber) and topographical mapping work, as well promoting forest conservation practices within the timber industry using ideas and techniques developed by Dr. Clark.

He married Eva Couch (b. 1872). The marriage produced at least one child, a daughter.

== International 1/4-inch log rule ==
Clark derived this rule empirically from observations of the losses in the cutting of logs into lumber. This is one of the few log rules that incorporated log taper into the cutting solutions. Log taper is assumed to be 1/2-inch to 4 feet of log length. There are a series of formulae for different log lengths.

For a 20-foot log:
V= (0.995D^{2} – 1.221D – 1.719), with
V= volume in board feet, and
D= diameter measured in inches at the small end, inside bark

== See also ==
- Girard form class

== Selected publications ==
- Clark, J. F. (November 1899). "On the Toxic Effect of Deleterious Agents on the Germination and Development of Certain Filamentous Fungi". Botanical Gazette. 28 (5): 289–327. doi:10.1086/327923. JSTOR 2465020.
- "A new dendrometer or timber scale". Journal of Forestry. 11 (4): 467–469. 1913.
- Chapter XXII. Chemistry and toxicology of mushrooms in: Atkinson, George Francis (1901). Studies of American fungi: mushrooms, edible, poisonous, etc (2nd ed.). Andrus & Church.
