= Wedge prism =

The wedge prism is a prism with a shallow angle between its input and output surfaces. This angle is usually 3 degrees or less. Refraction at the surfaces causes the prism to deflect light by a fixed angle. When viewing a scene through such a prism, objects will appear to be offset by an amount that varies with their distance from the prism.

== Deflection angle ==
For a wedge prism in air, rays of light passing through the prism are deflected by the angle δ, which is approximately given by

$$\delta \approx (n - 1) \alpha\ ,$$

where n is the index of refraction of the prism material, and α is the angle between the prism's surfaces.

== Applications ==
The term "optical wedge" refers to any shallow angle between two plane surfaces of a window. This wedge may range from a few millionths of a degree of perfect parallelism to as much as three degrees of angle. Even though high-precision optics, such as optical flats, may be lapped and polished to extremely high levels of parallelism, nearly all optics with parallel faces have some slight wedge. This margin of error is usually listed in minutes or seconds of arc. Windows manufactured with an intentional wedge are often referred to as wedge prisms, and typically come with wedge angles of one, two, or three degrees. Many applications exist for wedge prisms, including laser-beam steering, rangefinding and variable focusing.

=== Beam steering ===
A pair of wedge prisms, called a Risley prism pair, can be used for beam steering. In this case, rotating one wedge in relation to the other will change the direction of the beam. When the wedges angle in the same direction, the angle of the refracted beam becomes greater. When the wedges are rotated to angle in opposite directions, they cancel each other out, and the beam is allowed to pass straight through.

Moving a wedge either closer or farther away from the laser can also be used to steer the beam. When the wedge is moved closer to the target (farther away from the laser), the refracted beam will move across the target. When two wedges in opposite directions slide relative to each other they can be used to provide variable focusing for cameras, allowing objects at vastly different distances to be photographed, in focus, at the same focal plane. This method is common in aerial or space launch-vehicle photography, when the distance to the object is changing very rapidly. Wedges were sometimes used in rangefinding, by combining the image formed by one telescope with the image formed by another.

=== Forestry ===
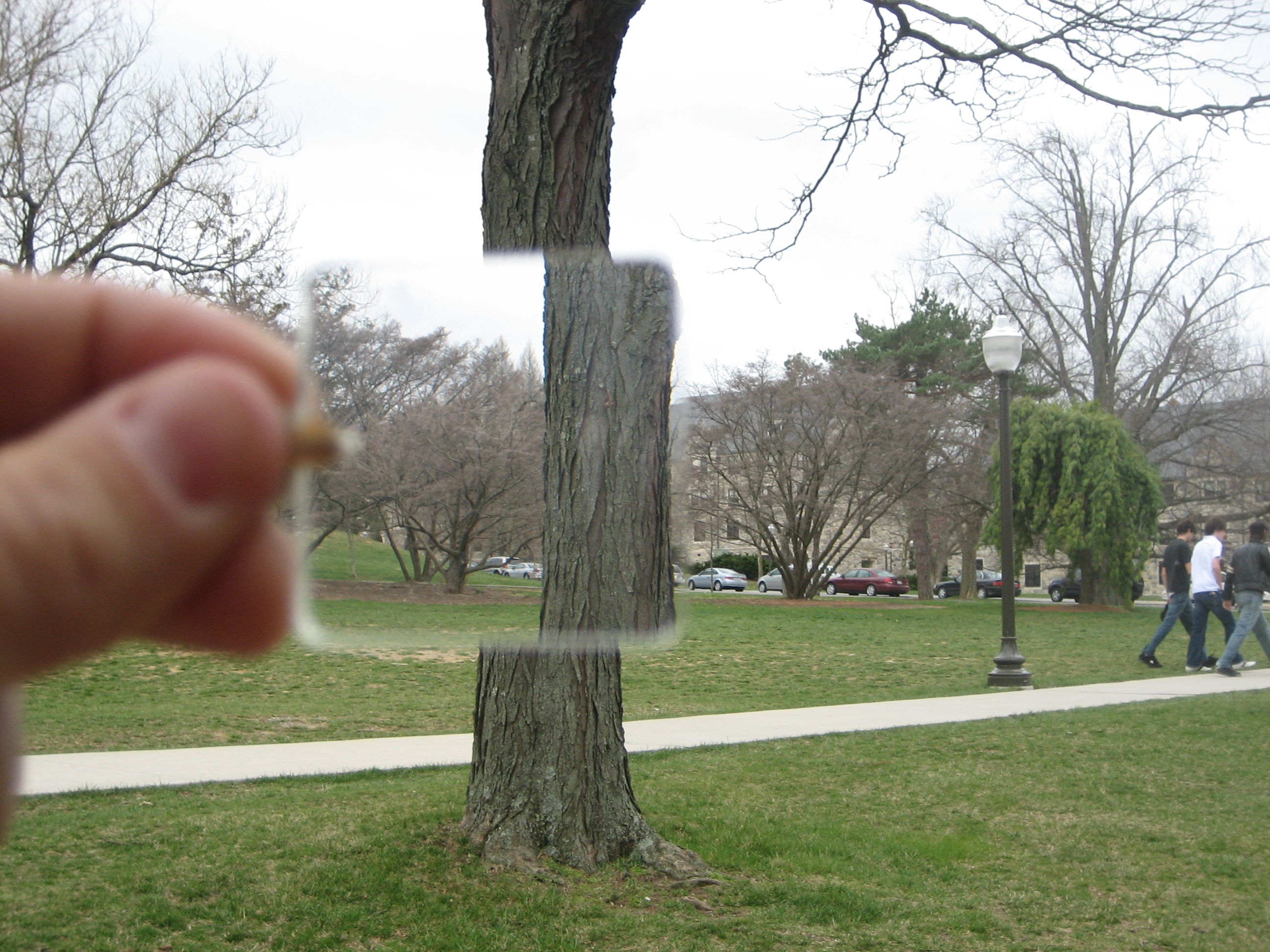
Figure 1. View through 10 factor wedge prism of an "IN" tree.

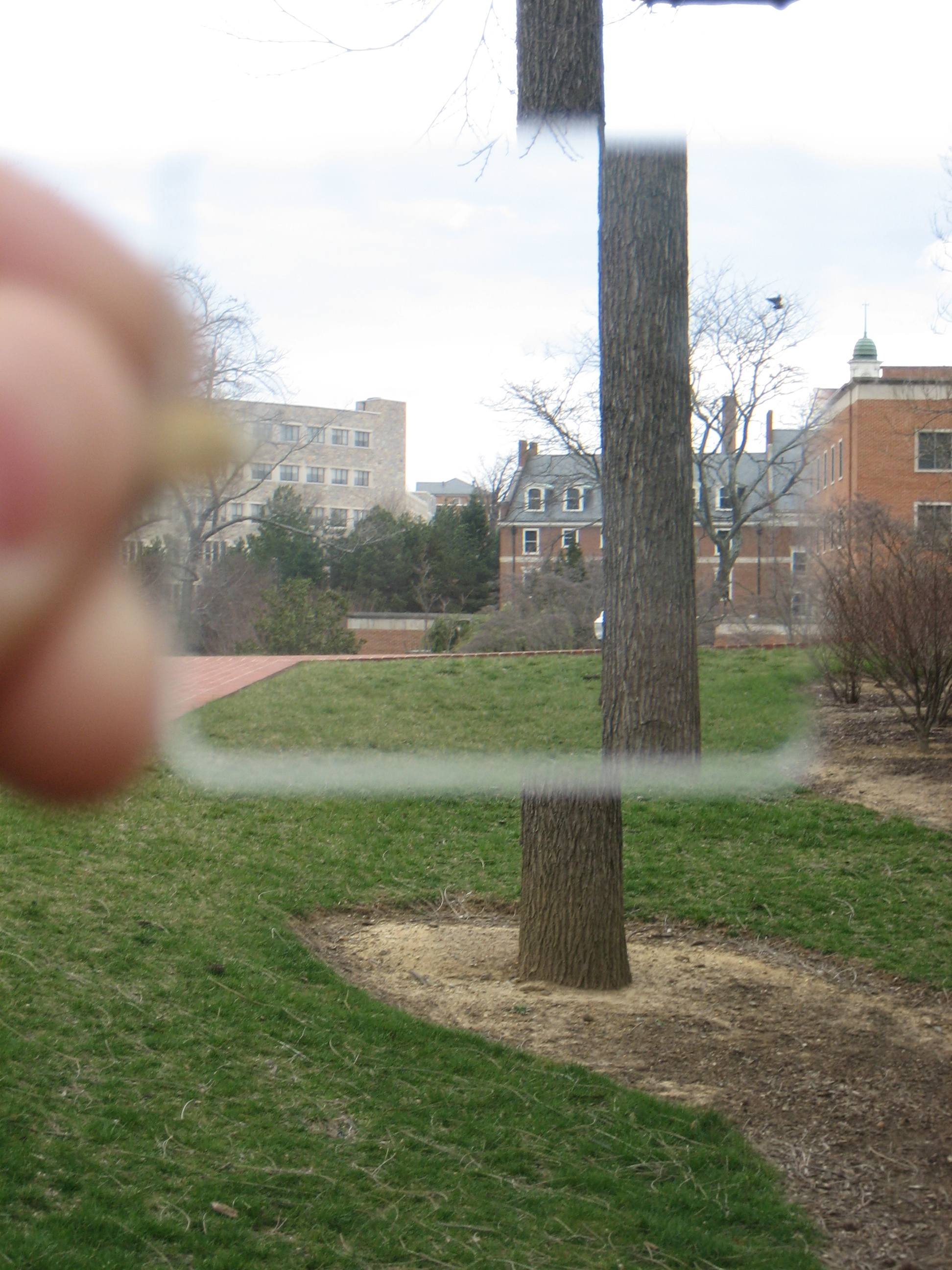
Figure 2. View through 10 factor wedge prism of a "Borderline" tree.

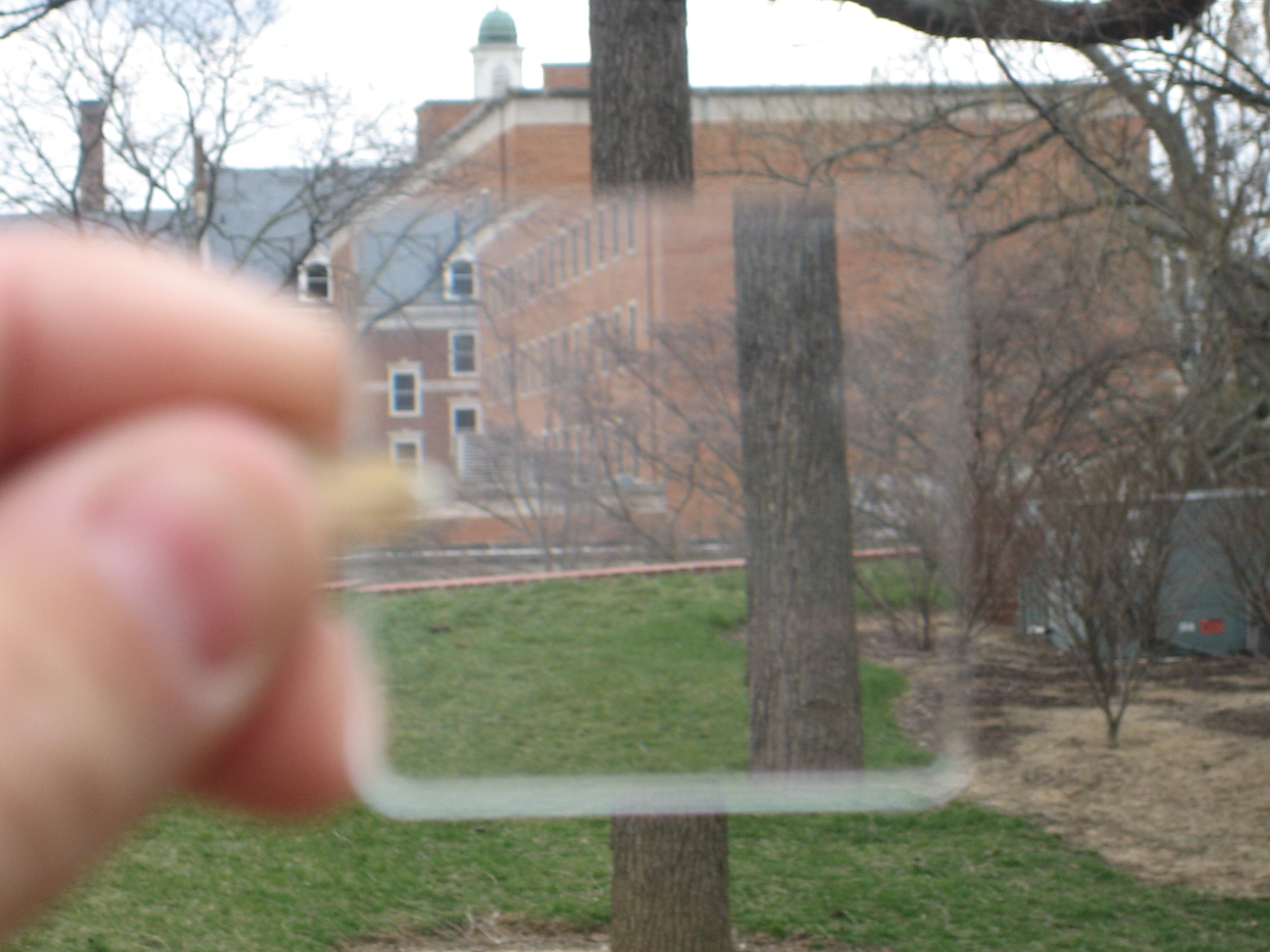
Figure 3. View through 10 factor wedge prism of an "OUT" tree.

The wedge prism is primarily used in a similar manner as an angle gauge in variable-radius plot sampling. In this type of sampling, the wedge prism is used to estimate basal area of a group of trees by counting trees which are "in" or "out" of a plot centered on a single point. Because the wedge prism refracts light to offset the object of interest (e.g. a tree), it can be used to determine whether or not the tree should be counted from a given point, based on the diameter at breast height of the tree and its distance from that point.

In this type of sampling, the prism is held a comfortable distance away from the eye with the bottom edge parallel to the ground, and trees are sighted through the prism approximately 4.5 ft. above the ground. A tree is an "in" tree if the offset section of the tree overlaps the bole as viewed without the prism (Figure 1). A tree where the offset section of the trunk is perfectly aligned with the original bole is a borderline tree (Figure 2) and DBH must be measured to determine if it should be counted (or, more commonly in practice, every other borderline tree is counted). A tree where the offset section of the tree does not overlap or touch the original bole is an "out" tree (Figure 3) and is not counted.

Basal area is estimated by multiplying the count of "in" trees at a given point by the 'factor' of the prism. Prism factor is based on the angle of the prism, and prisms are available in different factors, expressed in both square feet/acre (5, 10, 20 BAF are most common) and square meters/hectare (1-5 BAF are common). Prism size is chosen to yield a statistically valid estimate of basal area - 6-10 "in" trees per plot are required, which requires a prism of the proper factor depending on the size of the trees being cruised. Larger trees will be "in" from further away, and a larger factor prism (20 or 30 ft^{2}/ac, 5–8 m^{2}/ha) can be used. Smaller trees will be "out" in a larger factor prism unless they are very close, and consequently a smaller factor prism must be used.

Importantly, the bottom edge of the prism must be roughly parallel to the ground in order to provide an accurate estimate on sloped ground. Wedge prisms can be difficult to use in wet conditions due to the effect water droplets have on the optical properties of the glass. Wedge prisms come in different colors such as clear or amber. The amber provides the same function as the clear wedge prism, only it reduces glare and is easier to use on overcast or cloudy days.

Operating a wedge prism is one technique used in forestry today because the wedge prism is simple, relatively inexpensive, portable, and as accurate as other angle gauges when properly calibrated and used properly. One simply holds the prism directly over the plot center, and by focusing on a tree, the refracted light will offset the trunk of the tree. The wedge prism is used to take measurements in both land management and in timber procurement. Other tools often used to accompany the wedge prism in taking forest inventory are clinometers, Biltmore sticks, relascopes, and diameter tapes.

A wedge prism can also be used with a target placed at plot center, to establish fixed radius plots. In this function, the size of the target is carefully calibrated to the desired plot size, and the plot is defined as all the area in which the target is "in" as viewed through the prism.
