= Relascope =

Instrument for measuring tree dimensions in forest surveys

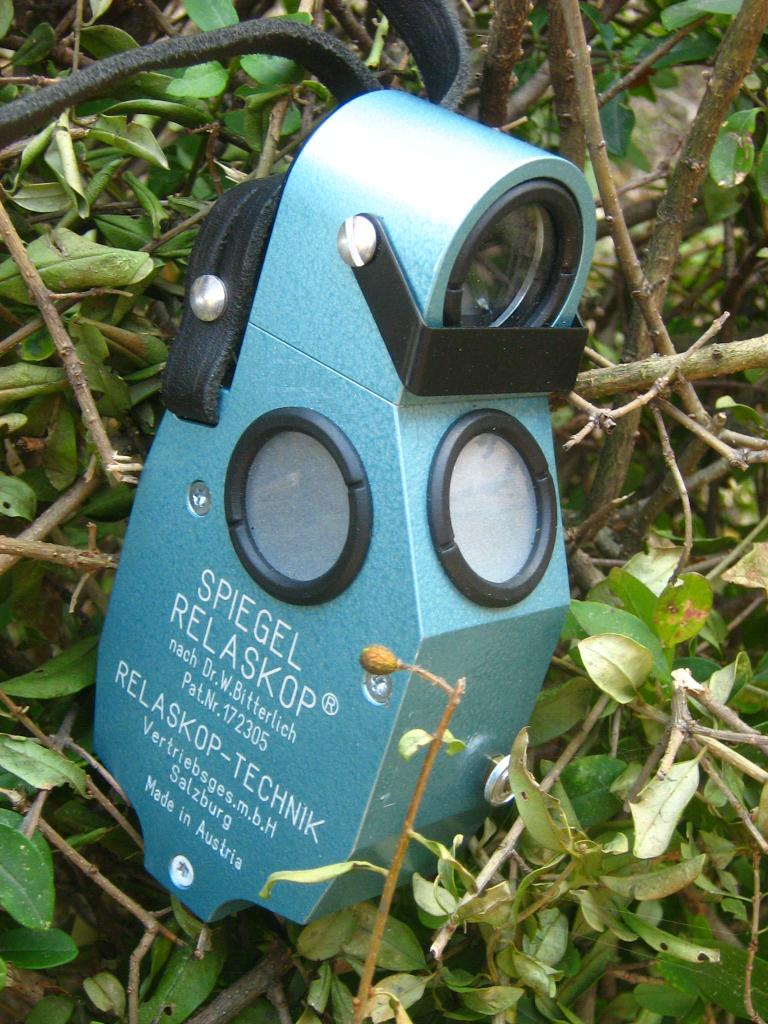
A relascope (Spiegelrelaskop)

The relascope, invented by Walter Bitterlich, is a multi-use instrument for forest inventory. It is primarily used to find the height of a tree, the basal area of a tree, and the diameter of a tree anywhere along the bole. This instrument is used mostly for applications involving variable radius sample plots in a forest survey.

== Method of operation ==
The relascope has a sight hole on the back and a clear window at the front to allow the user to sight through the tool. There are three light inlet holes which are used to light the scale. This is one of the major problems with the relascope, the way this instrument is designed it cannot be used in low light. This is not a problem with the electronic laser based version, called a tele-relascope.

== Use ==
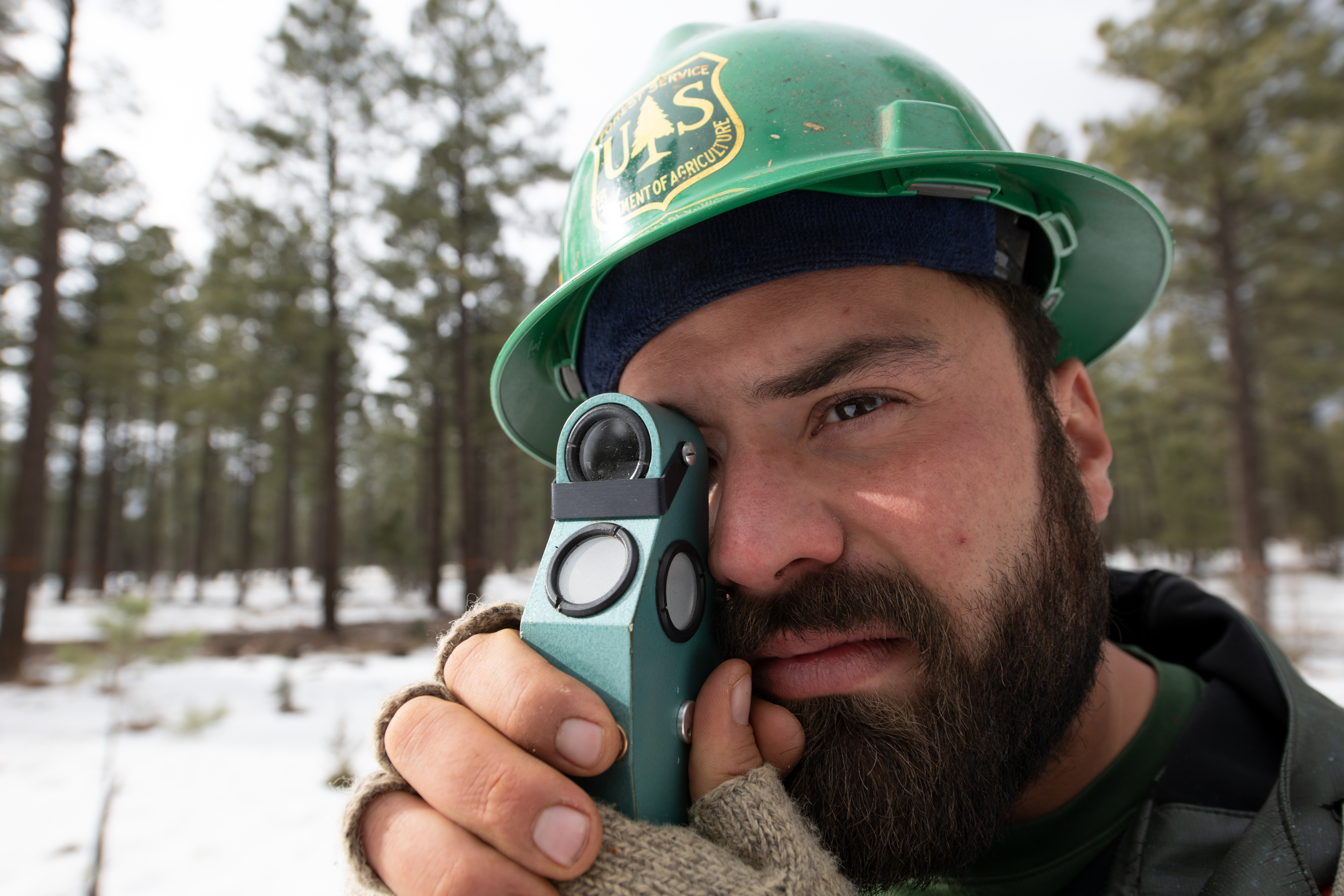
Relascope usage

The relascope is used by looking through the hole in the front of the instrument. When users look through this hole they will see several scales that are used for different measurements on the bottom half of their view, and on the top half they will see the tree that they are looking at. There are three scales for height of the tree used depending on the distance of the user from the tree, five scales for diameter and two scales for basal area used depending on desired basal area factor.

== Function ==
The relascope is very similar to the angle gauge and the wedge prism in that it can be used to find the basal area of a tree from a point depending on the basal area factor in a variable radius sampling method. The main difference in this instrument though is that it has multiple uses as described previously. Some other advantages over similar devises in that it accounts for the slope one is from the tree giving a more accurate measurement than similar tools.

The relascope can also be used to find the distance from a tree (range). This is done in the same manner as when one uses a transit using a set of trigonometric formulae based on height and angle. The relascope is not commonly used for this because of its difficulty and the amount of time it takes to do this.

Tree height is another use of this instrument. It does this by using several weighted wheels that spin based on the position of the instrument. The readings off of this scale will give the height of the tree based on the user's distance from the tree. When taking height, users measure either 66 or 120 feet from the tree; this is the reason for the multiple scales in the relascope. Users then look first at the top of the tree or at the highest point on the bole that they want to measure and record the number from the height dial inside the scope, then they look at the bottom of the tree to find a positive or negative number. They take this number and subtract it from the first number recorded; this gives the height of the tree. This is very similar to the way a clinometer is used.

== Point sampling ==
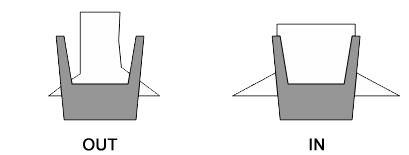
Figure 1

The relascope is often used for point sampling. This is done by using the set spacing marked in the relascope to gauge whether a tree is in or out of the stand. A tree is IN or OUT based on whether it fills the space between the lines on the scale in the relascope. If it does then the tree is IN. If it doesn't then the tree is OUT (Figure 1). If the tree is IN this means that it is counted as basal area within one's plot. The basal area is obtained by multiplying the number of trees by the basal area factor, which is based on the width of the gauge.
