= Quadratic mean diameter =

In forestry, quadratic mean diameter or QMD is a measure of central tendency which is considered more appropriate than arithmetic mean for characterizing the group of trees which have been measured. For n trees, QMD is calculated using the quadratic mean formula:

$\sqrt {\frac{\sum{D_i}^{2}}{n}}$

where ${D_i}$ is the diameter at breast height of the i^{th} tree. Compared to the arithmetic mean, QMD assigns greater weight to larger trees – QMD is always greater than or equal to arithmetic mean for a given set of trees. QMD can be used in timber cruises to estimate the standing volume of timber in a forest, because it has the practical advantage of being directly related to basal area, which in turn is directly related to volume. QMD can also be calculated as:

$\sqrt {\frac{BA}{k * n}}$

where BA is stand basal area, n is the number of trees, and k is a constant based on measurement units - for BA in ft^{2} and QMD in inches, k=0.005454; for BA in m^{2} and QMD in cm, k=0.00007854.
