= Risley prisms =

Pair of counter-rotating wedge prisms used for optical beam steering

Risley prisms steer beams using two rotating prisms.

Risley prisms (also called a Risley prism pair or rotating wedge prisms) are a beam steering device comprising two thin wedge prisms mounted coaxially and rotated independently about the optical axis. By varying the relative rotation angles of the wedges, the device deflects an incident beam to any azimuth within a cone whose half-angle is set by the prism wedge angles and glass refractive index. Risley pairs are used for beam steering and pointing in applications such as free-space laser communications, tracking, scanning and imaging lidar, and in ophthalmic instruments for variable prism testing of ocular alignment.

Advantages include a compact, sealed, and coaxial form factor; continuous two-axis pointing with only rotary actuators; and potential for large clear apertures. Limitations include chromatic dispersion, non-linear angle–angle mapping that requires calibration or inverse kinematics, finite angular range compared with gimbals, and a small residual scan radius set by prism thickness and spacing.

== History ==
The device is named after the American ophthalmologist Samuel Doty Risley (1845–1920), who described a “new rotary prism” to provide continuously variable prism power for clinical testing in 1889. Later historical notes clarified the eponymy and early ophthalmic usage of the rotary prism in the late 19th and early 20th centuries.

== Operating principle ==
Risley prism operation. When the two prisms are in phase, the light is refracted by a large angle, and when they are out of phase, the two prisms cancel each other out and the beam direction is unaffected.

Each thin wedge prism deflects a paraxial ray by an angle $\delta \approx (n-1)\alpha$, where $n$ is the refractive index and $\alpha$ is the wedge angle (in radians). With two identical wedges, the net deflection is given by the vector sum of the individual deviation vectors as the prisms rotate; the steering magnitude ranges from near zero (wedges opposed) to approximately twice the single-prism deviation (wedges aligned). Accurate prediction and inverse control (computing the two rotation angles from a desired output pointing direction) may be performed using first-order paraxial models or exact non-paraxial ray tracing; closed-form and iterative inverse solutions have been published.

== Scan patterns and control ==
Typical scan pattern of a Risley prism with speed ratio -0.743 (this image is animated, click to view animation).

With constant, possibly unequal rotation rates of the two prisms, the output tracing on a distant screen resembles a rose curve pattern whose radius and periodicity depend on the speed ratio and initial phase. These scan families are commonly used for area coverage and can be shaped by motion laws or by multi-pair cascades.

If the relative speeds between the two prisms is an irrational number, or if the speeds gradually change over time, the scanned area will become denser over time.

== Optical aberrations and calibration ==
Because Risley prisms are refractive, they introduce chromatic dispersion and field-dependent distortion. Approaches to mitigate these effects include achromatized materials, diffractively corrected wedges (grisms), and calibration of the forward/inverse steering models. However, chromatic aberrations are less relevant when the beam is a monochromatic laser beam.

Another characteristic of Risley prisms is that even when the prisms are oriented for minimal deviation, finite thickness and spacing cause the beam to be offset in a small residual radius (even if the direction of the beam is unchanged). This must be considered in precise pointing applications.

== Applications ==
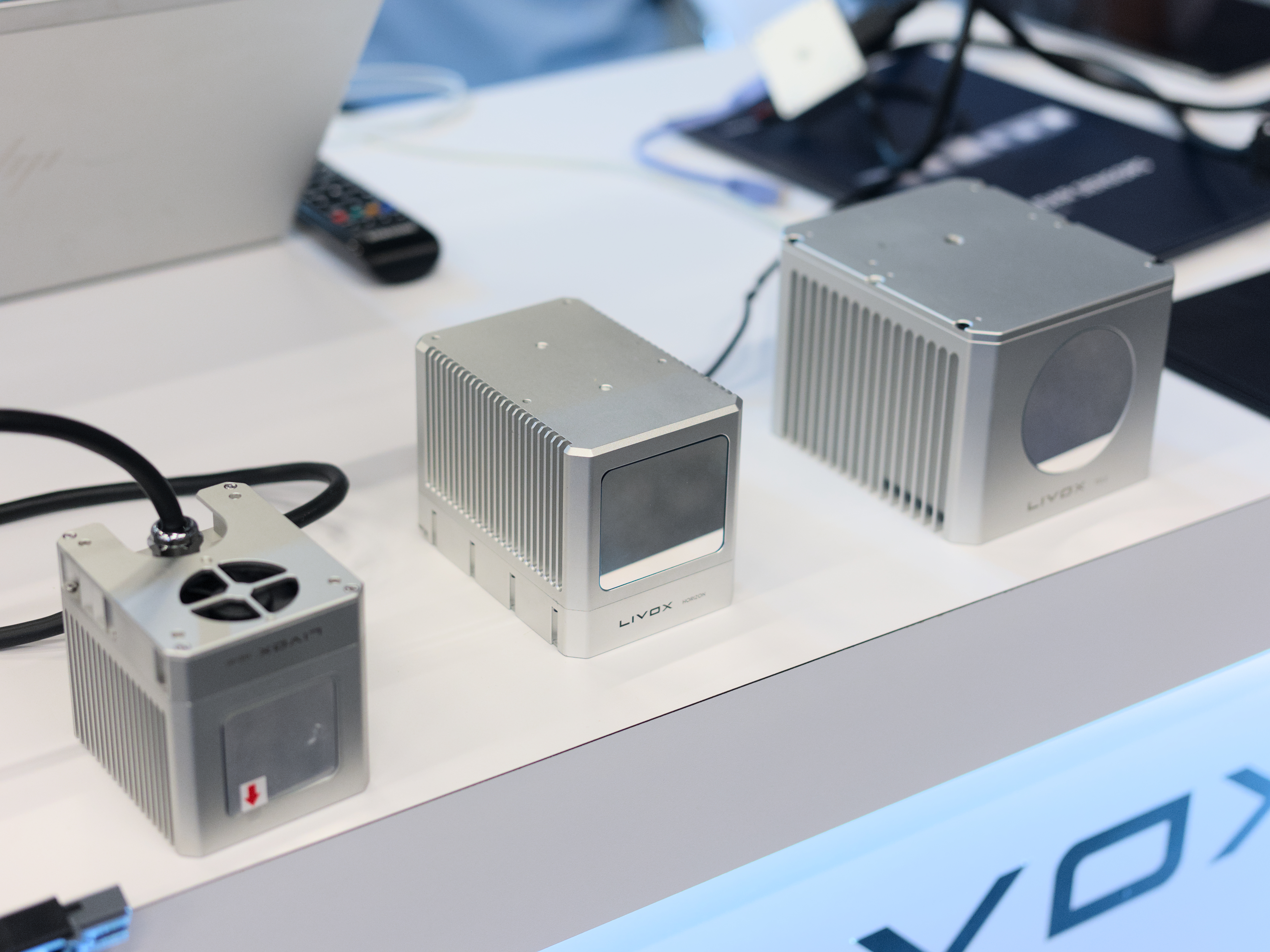
Livox lidars use Risley prisms.

- Ophthalmology. The original rotary prism provided continuously variable prism power for assessing ocular alignment and remains a component in some phoropters and therapeutic devices. Modern studies have explored app-controlled dual-rotational prisms for vergence exercises.
- Laser tracking and free-space optical communications. Risley pairs provide compact, coaxial steering without moving large mirrors, and are used in tracking/pointing systems and FSO links; performance and inverse control have been analyzed extensively.
- Scanning lidar and imaging. Rotational pairs are used to generate configurable scan patterns and wide fields of view for coherent and single-photon 3D imaging.
- Aerospace seekers and pointing. Patents and reports describe Risley-based beam directors inside conformal domes for compact guidance and tracking.
