= Stocking (forestry) =

Stocking is a quantitative measure of the area occupied by trees, usually measured in terms of well-spaced trees or basal area per hectare, relative to an optimum or desired level of density. It is also used as a measure of the growth potential of a site that may be affected by vegetation in the area along with other nearby trees. Stocking can be shown as a ratio of the current stand density to the stand density of a maximally-occupied site. Stocking measures account for three things: the cover type and species mixture in the stand, the basal area per acre, and the number of trees per acre.

Stocking allows for comparing stands that may have diverse ecology. Stocking is a major part of forest management, both in commercial applications and for restoration or preservation. A desirable level of stocking is often considered that which maximizes timber production, or other management objectives.

== Stocking charts ==
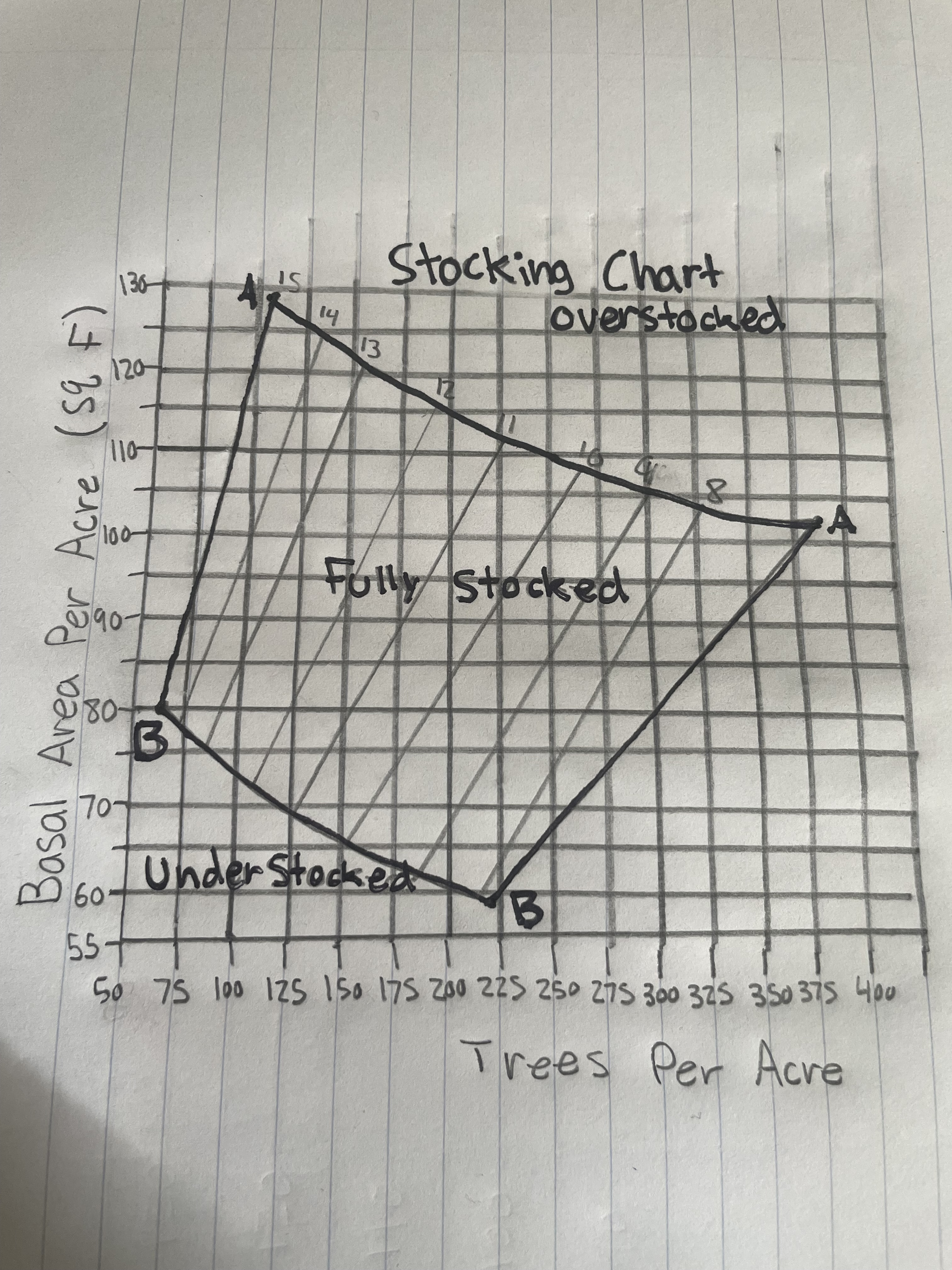
Example of a Stocking Chart

Once the stands have been measured, they are marked as either overstocked, 50% stocked, or understocked. When an area is overstocked it means that it has too many trees in the given area, and it will be affecting the growth of other trees that are around it. When an area is understocked, the stand site is not at its full potential tree growth. More trees should be planted to maximize tree growth in the stand site. Stocking charts or guides help determine stocking status.

When there are two stands that have similar basal areas but different amounts of trees in the stand, they can be compared using a stocking chart. In these charts are 2 reference lines, A and B, which show where an area is being overstocked, understocked, or fully stocked. The A-line represents the limit for an uncut forest, any point above this line is considered overstocked. The B-line represents the best number of trees to be grown in each area based on the space in the stand, any point below this line is considered understocked. If the area of a planted stand is between the A and B lines, they will reduce the number of trees down to the B line to get the maximum growth out of the trees.

Foresters usually want to have a stand around the B-line because it will give them the maximum growth out of the stand with the fewest trees possible. However, cutting down to the B-line after planting may reduce the success of the remaining trees.

When it comes to a stand that is overstocked or understocked, it is important to make the correct decision on how to get the most growth potential. When a stand is right on the edge of being understocked it may not be beneficial to plant more trees in the stand. Planting more trees may cause the stand to become overstocked, and it will not have the maximum growth potential. When there is a very understocked stand, there are two options for helping the stand. Either plant new trees in the stand as an underplant or clearcut the stand and restart by planting all new trees. If there is a fully stocked stand, modifications may need to be made to keep the stand in the stocked area in the chart.

== Measurement types ==
=== Basal area per acre ===
When stocking, a tree's basal area is measured. The basal area is a cross-sectional area of the stump taken about 4.5 feet (1.4 m) above the ground. The equation for calculating the basal area of trees in a stand is Basal Area = 0.005454 DBH^{2}, where DBH is the diameter of the tree at the aforementioned measuring height. Not every stand is uniform, so multiple trees should be measured to get a precise average. Larger stands will require more basal area measurements for a precise average than a smaller stand, sample size should be considered when calculating stocking. The base number for the measurements that should be taken in a stand is 20 – 25, giving a good estimate for most stands. When calculating basal area, foresters use a special prism or gauge that can help get precise estimates.

=== Trees per acre ===
Stocking also requires a measurement of the trees per acre in the stand. If possible, the exact number of trees in the stand is preferred. Otherwise an average trees per acre can be estimated.

== See also ==
- Stand level modelling
