= Thinning =

Removal of some plants to improve the growth of other plants

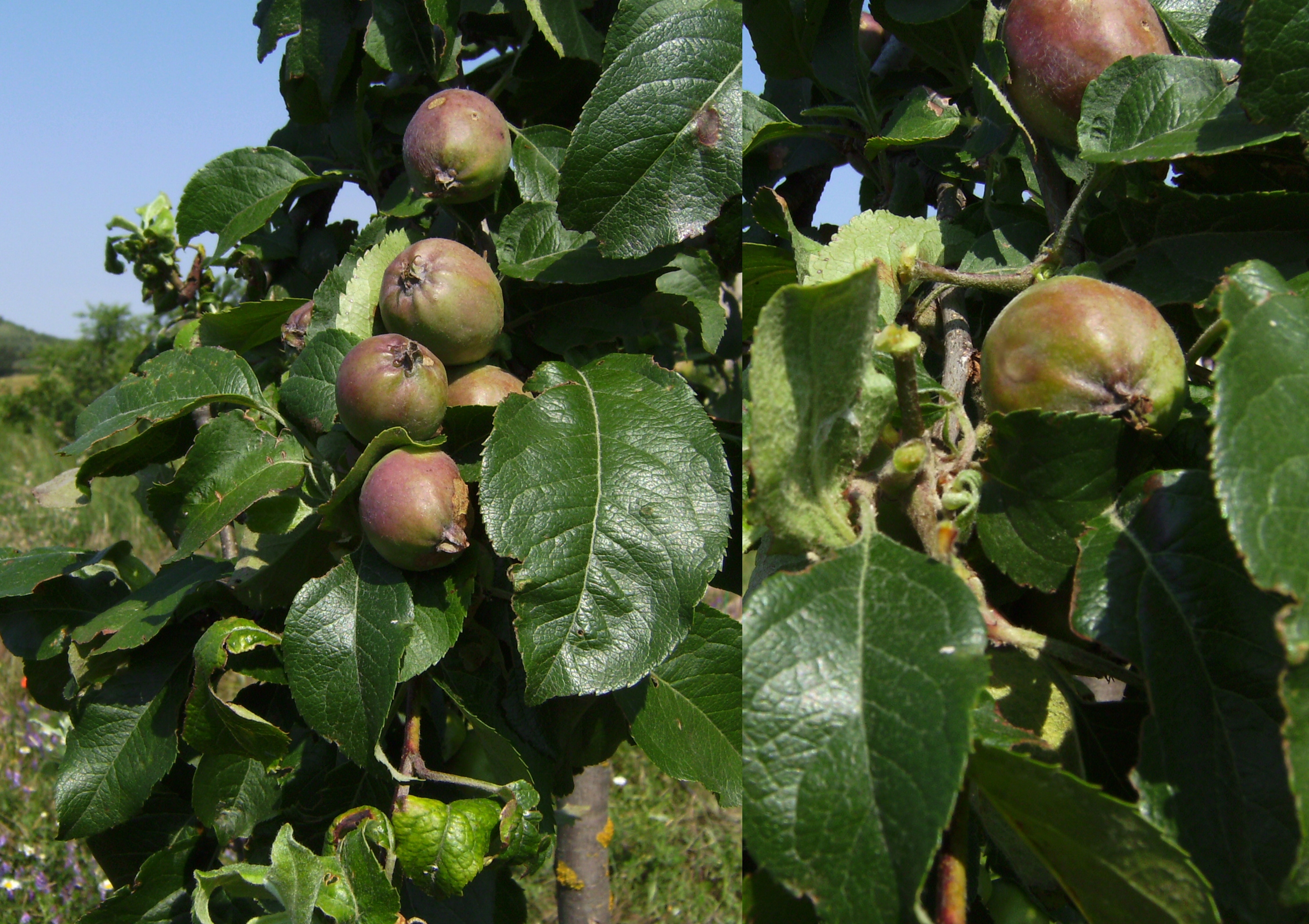
Apples thinning: before (at left) after (at right)

In agricultural sciences, thinning is the removal of some plants, or parts of plants, to make room for the growth of others. Selective removal of parts of a plant such as branches, buds, or roots is typically known as pruning.

In forestry, thinning is the selective removal of trees, primarily undertaken to improve the growth rate or health of the remaining trees. Overcrowded trees are under competitive stress from their neighbors. Thinning may be done to increase the resistance of the stand to environmental stress such as drought, insect infestation, extreme temperature, or wildfire.

== In forestry ==
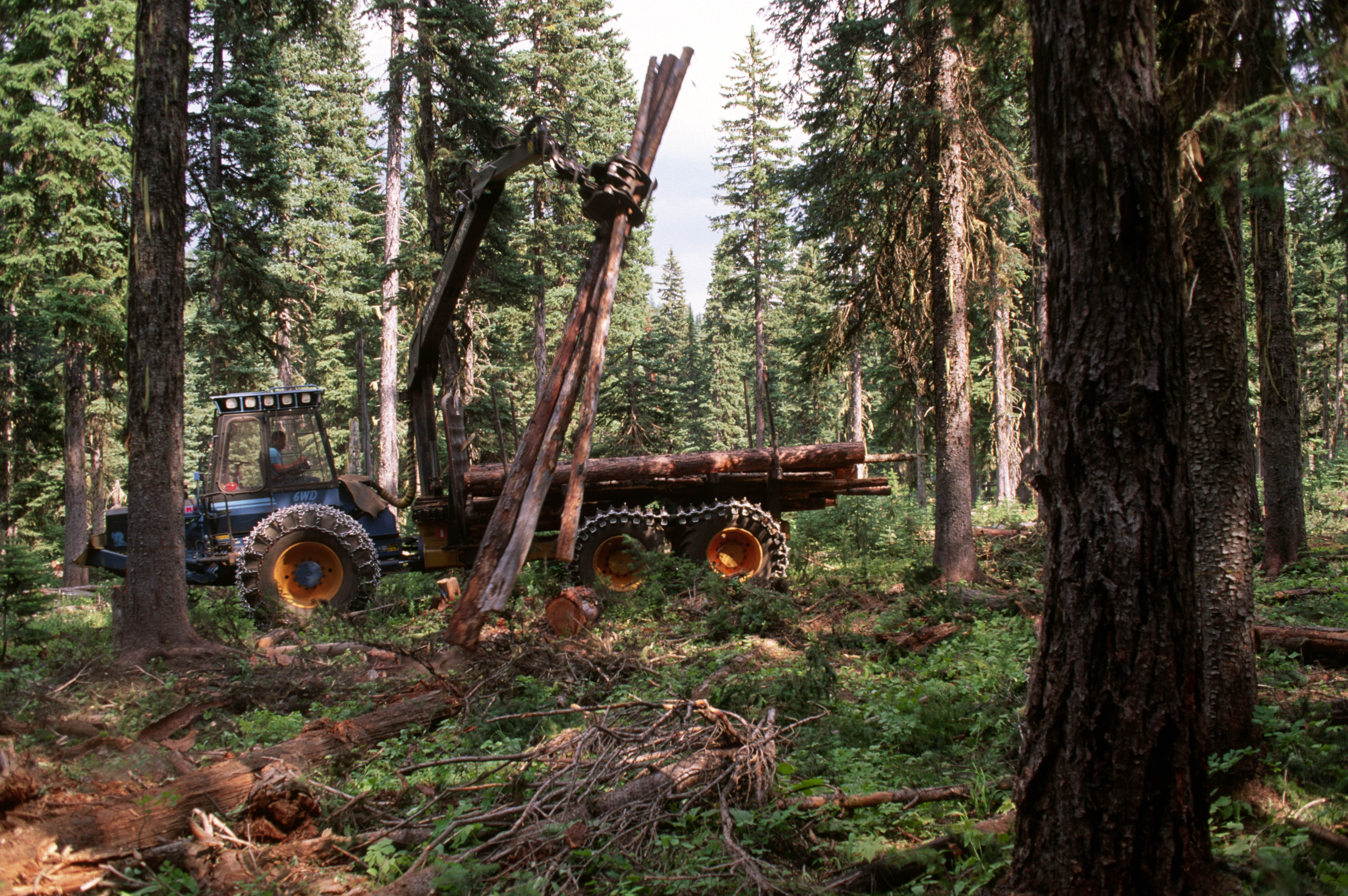
Thinning in the Umatilla National Forest

Tree thinning may be practised in forestry to make a stand more profitable in an upcoming final felling, or to advance ecological goals such as increasing biodiversity or accelerating the development of desired structural attributes such as large diameter trees with long tree crowns.

Early thinning, e.g. after 20 years, rather than late thinning, e.g. after 50 years, has different effects on the trees thinned. An early thinning would encourage trees to develop wider crowns, increase trunk diameter and be more stable against threats like snow breakage or windthrow. Too much thinning too early in their lifespan could cause a site to overgrow with shrubs and prevent an understory from regenerating efficiently. Alternatively, thinning an area later would mean that trees will grow tall and slender; although the trees would gain value incrementally with time, they may be less marketable as thinness reduces said value. Epicormic shooting is a risk when thinning is carried out tardily, which can lead to tree branchiness and the presence of knots in the resultant timber harvest, again reducing value.

Traditionally, thinning has been performed to create a desired balance between individual tree attributes (such as tree diameter) and area-relative attributes such as volume. It has been, and often still is, applied with the desire to create uniform stands. As a result, thinning treatments are often described in terms of number of trees per area to remain or average spacing between trees. It is also necessary when too many trees were initially planted or survived through the seedling phase. Planting less and thinning less saves money in commercial forestry; thinning is carried out in a balanced manner, dependent on site qualities as well as planting régimes.

There is no certain outcome from thinning nor standard timing for it. Individual site conditions and responses of individual or mixed species on sites may vary considerably and thus responses to thinnings likewise are inconsistent. Norway spruce on a suitable site have responded well in terms of growth increment, to late thinnings (after 50 years) whereas other species have not for example slash pine.

Due to such variability it is better to talk about a thinning régime rather than one particular method of thinning taking place in a stand.

=== Thinning methods ===
- Thinning from below – this low thinning can be split into 4 Grades: A Grade is a very light thinning, that removes all overtopped trees Kraft crown class 4 and 5. B Grade is a very light thinning that removes overtopped trees and intermediates which are Kraft Crown class 4,5 and some 3s, C Grade and D Grade are a moderate and heavy thinning respectively removing anything that will not lead to high quality tree crown growth.
- Thinning from above – this crown thinning removes all of the trees that impact crown wise on other trees. Smaller trees, Kraft crown class 5 for example would just be ignored and left in the stand and not cut. It is also called the French method.
- Diameter-limit thinning this selection thinning is related to the Borggreve silvicultural system. Large trees over a certain diameter are removed for smaller trees in good condition to grow. These in turn after some growth are thinned. Eventually the stand is exhausted after several cycles and the remnant is clear cut and replanted. It is used with shade tolerant species like Western hemlock.
- Geometrical thinning – mechanical thinning like this is used in plantations where one row is taken out and the next left no matter the tree condition. A different grid might be used for natural stands sometimes called strip thinning.
- Free thinning – this is done as crop tree release and it means thinning around a wanted tree, over a stand. This may mean in some areas no thinning and in others a lot of thinning. This heterogeneity represents where the most valuable trees are.

=== Ecological thinning ===
A thinning in which the trees removed have little or no economic value is called a pre-commercial thinning. Ecological thinning is a variant of this being studied for use in forest conservation. The primary aim of forest thinning is to increase growth of selected trees, but ecological thinning is done to favor development of wildlife habitat (such as hollows) rather than focusing on increased timber yields. Thinning may also reduce the risk of wildfire by increasing availability of groundwater as well as reducing fuel for wildfires.

Chemical thinning is a form of non-commercial thinning in which the trees are killed while they stand by injecting a chemical such as glyphosate (Round Up) into a cut made in the stem. This reduces the number of live stems remaining, providing a benefit to those that remain and may be undertaken where the cost of a traditional thin is high. It can also be done on very exposed sites where breaking the canopy through a traditional thinning operation would expose the stand to a high risk of windthrow.

Another type of thinning is called variable density thinning. In this type of thinning, the intent is to manage various portions of the stand in different ways to create structural and spatial heterogeneity. The intent is often to increase biodiversity or wildlife habitat. In variable density thinning, some portions of the stand may not be entered. These unentered areas, sometimes called reserves, leave islands, or skips (as they are skipped over) help retain a large range of tree diameters, serve as a future source of competition-related mortality, and may preserve snags, down wood, and understory plants.

Other portions of a stand could be heavily thinned or gaps or openings could be created. These areas accelerate the growth rates of trees in the open areas or on their perimeter and help retain or develop long crowns with live branches. Another portion of the stand, sometimes referred to as the matrix, is thinned to result in residual trees densities which area in between the other extremes. Over the whole area, a wide variety of trees with different diameters and species are retained.

=== Virtual thinning in marteloscopes ===
Timber marking - selecting the trees to be cut in a forest stand by marking them - is a crucial task for a forest manager. Because of the irreversible character of cutting trees, tools were developed to virtually practice tree selection. A marteloscope is a forest site (typically a one hectare rectangular site) where all trees are numbered, mapped and recorded. This information can then be visualised through an application on a hand-held device such as a tablet.

== In agriculture ==
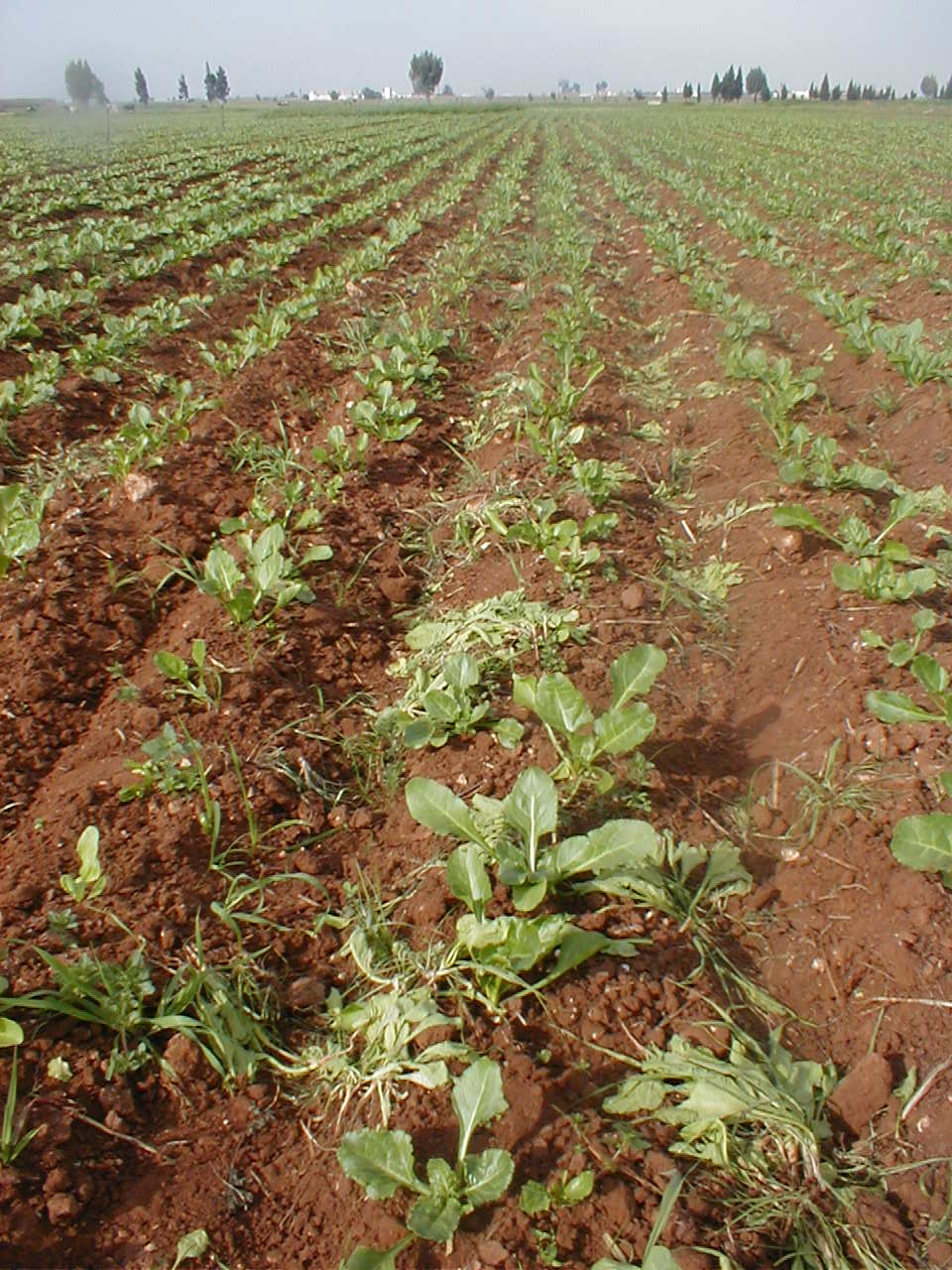
Sugar beets thinning

In agriculture and gardening, thinning is the selective removal of flowers, fruits, shoots, and seedlings or young plants to allow adequate space for the remaining organs/plants to grow efficiently. In large-scale farming, techniques like precision seeding and transplanting can eliminate the need for thinning by starting plants at their optimum spacing. On a smaller scale, such as a home vegetable garden, thinning can be used as a way to make maximum use of space for certain crops. For example, beets, carrots, green onions and others can be planted densely, and then thinned to make room for continued growth of the plants left in the soil, and also as a harvest of baby vegetables (beet greens, baby carrots, baby onions). Also thinning is used in post harvesting.

== See also ==
- Crop destruction
- Cleaning (forestry)
- Pruning
