= Site tree (forestry) =

Site tree refers to a type of tree used in forestry, which is used to classify the quality of growing conditions trees at a particular forest location. A site tree, is a single tree in a stand (group of growing trees) that gives a good representation of the average dominant or co-dominant tree in the stand. Site trees are used to calculate the site index of the site in reference to a particular tree species. A site tree should belong to the dominant or co-dominant overstory class. The total height of the tree and age measured at Diameter at breast height of a sample of site trees will be used to determine a site index, which will show how tall trees of different species can grow on that site in a set amount of time. Sometimes several years are added to the breast-height age to account for time grown below 4.5 feet (1.4 m).

Determining what a site tree should look like in a stand varies with what kind of stand one is standing in. The simplest stand to find a site tree in is an even aged stand of a single species, much like a forest plantation. In this stand almost any dominant or co-dominant tree can be used. Finding a site tree is more difficult in uneven-aged, mixed species, stands.

There are multiple assumptions that are made when a site tree is chosen. Each site tree is assumed to have been a dominant or co-dominant individual its entire life. The site tree is assumed to have never been broken, injured, or suppressed. If the tree had any of these things happen to it the site index, which is derived from the site tree, value will be skewed.

Site trees are chosen by what species is being grown in a particular forest. Different trees on the same site will produce different measurements of a site index. For example, a yellow-poplar (Liriodendron tulipifera) growing on the same site as a white oak (Quercus alba) will grow at a different rate over the same amount of time. Graphs have been made that allow the user to measure a site tree of specific species and then use that measurement to predict what the measurements of a site tree of another species would be on the same site. This allows the user to predict how one species would grow on a site if that species was planted on the site. This is especially useful for timber production, harvest operations, or any other forestry silvicultural management that has specific species regeneration as a goal of the management plan.

== See also ==
- Forest inventory
- Site index
