= Exploration logging =

Exploration logging is the process of wireline logging, geophysical logging, geotechnical logging or geological logging of a drill hole, its core, or its rock cuttings for petrophysics or petrology. The practice is usually used in the mining, mineral exploration or oil and natural gas sectors.

Note that logging in this context does not refer to logging trees.

== See also ==
- Mineral exploration
- Drilling rig
- Mining
