= Volume table =

A volume table is a chart to aid in the estimation of standing timber volume. These tables are based on volume equations and use correlations between certain aspects of a tree to estimate the volume to a degree of certainty. The diameter at breast height (DBH) and the merchantable height are used to determine the total volume. Difficulties occur when estimating the form class of the tree in question. The Mesavage and Girard form classes used to classify the trees to decide which volume table should be used. These volume tables are also based on different log rules such a Scribner, Doyle, and International 1/4 in (6.4 mm) scale. In order to be effective, the proper form class must be selected as well as accurate DBH and height measurements.

Standard Volume Table, International 1/4in Rule, Form Class 80 Volume by 16-ft logs (bd-ft)
DBH (in)	1	2	3	4
10	39	63	80	
12	59	98	127	146
14	83	141	186	216
16	112	190	256	305
18	144	248	336	402
20	181	314	427	512
22	221	387	528	638
24	266	469	644	773
26	315	558	767	931
28	367	654	904	1096
30	424	758	1050	1272
32	485	870	1213	1480
34	550	989	1383	1691
36	620	1121	1571	1922
38	693	1256	1772	2167
40	770	1403	1977	2432

== History ==
In 1804, Heinrich Cotta suggested the idea of a volume table. However, it was not carried out until 1846 when the Bavarian Government conducted an extensive study which was used to find the volume of entire stands rather than single trees. From this, variations grew based on variables including growth rate, species, and site index.

== Fundamentals ==
One of the most common ways to calculate volume of a standing tree or of a log is by using the Doyle log rule. This formula uses the small end diameter of a log (D) (in inches) along with the log length (L) (in feet) to estimate the volume of a log. The Doyle log rule on average under estimates the volume of a log. See formula below:

Doyle: Bd.Ft = $L\left(\frac{D-4}{4}\right)^2$

Combining the Doyle log rule along with the Mesavage-Girard Form-Class, and Girard Upper-Log Taper Tables gives a quality estimation of log volume on and off stem. Using these Girard's tables one can estimate not only the first log of the tree but also the logs following the butt log.

== Sources ==
- Avery, Thomas; Burkhart, Harold (2002). Forest Measurements (5th ed.). New York: McGraw Hill.
- USDA (2001). "Tables for Estimating Board-Foot Volume of Timber"
