= High forest =

Type of forest consisting of large, tall mature trees with a closed canopy

A high forest is a type of forest originating from seed or from planted seedlings. In contrast to a low forest (also known as a coppice forest), a high forest usually consists of large, tall mature trees with a closed canopy. High forests can occur naturally or they can be created and maintained by human management. Trees in a high forest can be of one, a few or many species. A high forest can be even-aged or uneven-aged. Even-aged forests contain trees of one, or two successional age classes (generations). Uneven-aged forests have three or more age classes represented.

High forests have relatively high genetic diversity compared with coppice forests, which develop from vegetative reproduction. A high forest can have one or more canopy layers. The understory of a high forest can be open (parklike, easy to see and walk through), or it can be dense. A high forest's understory can have high or low vegetation species diversity.

== See also ==
- Coppicing
- Ecological thinning
- Old-growth forest
- Pollarding
- Silviculture
