= Tree inventory =

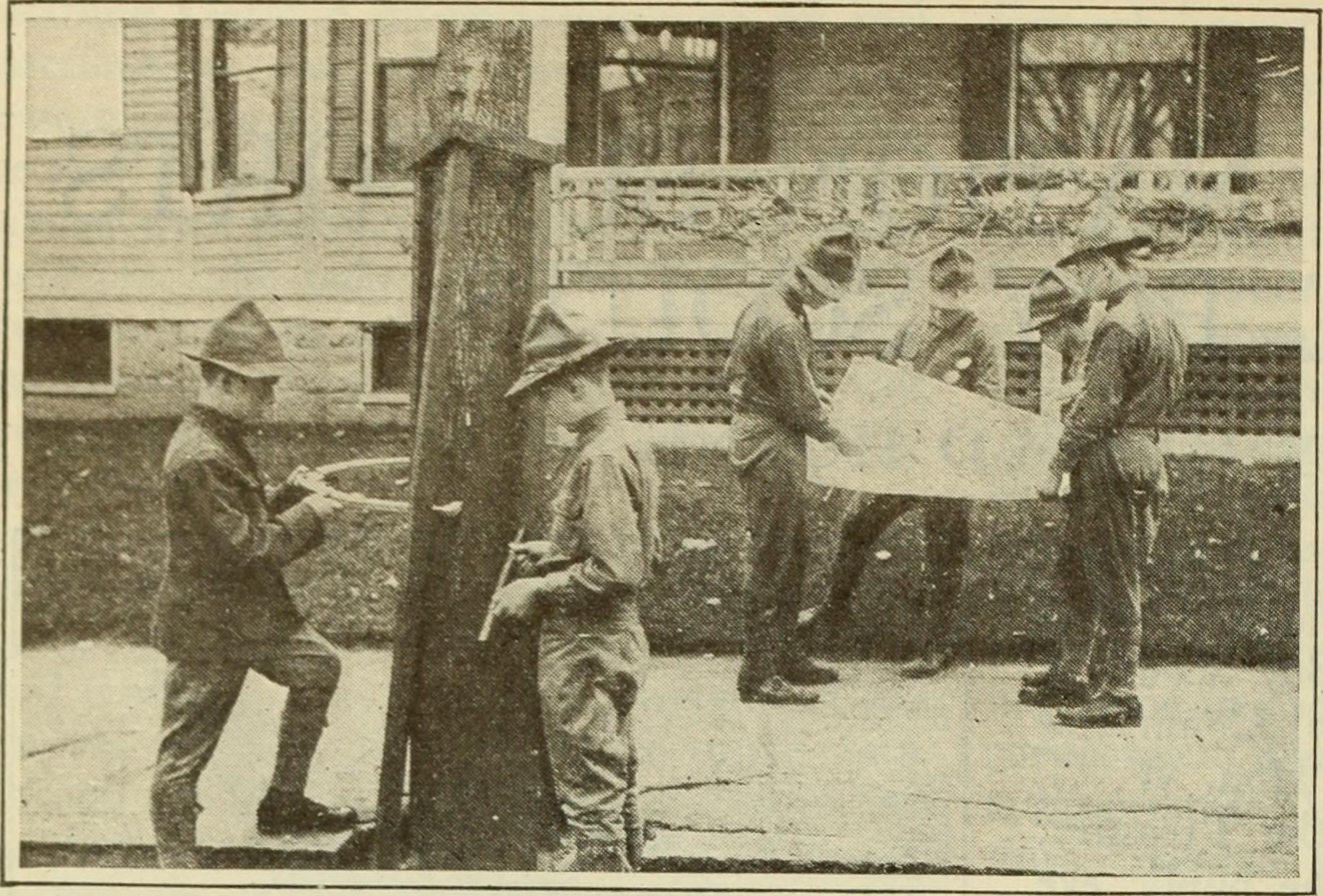
Boy Scouts taking a tree census for the government (c. 1919)

A tree inventory is the gathering of accurate information on the health and diversity of a community forest.

== Uses ==
Tree inventories focus on the attributes of individual trees, as compared to a forest inventory which seek to assess timber attributes on forest stands.

Information such as how many street trees there are, what their species is, and their condition is gathered. A community forest cannot be effectively managed unless its condition is known. A tree inventory may be conducted for many reasons, such as to determine if a community needs to implement an urban forestry program, in order to prioritize tree maintenance needs, to plan for the community's future, and to provide a basis for the implementation of a management plan. A tree inventory should provide tree species, preferably in binomial nomenclature (Latin names), size, such as DBH (diameter at breast height) and tree height, crown width, overall condition such as health and maintenance needs, overcrowding, possible problems, presence or absence of insects or diseases. Characteristics of the site should also be listed such as soil type and condition, root space, and safety.

== Types ==
There are four main types of tree inventory. They are specific problem inventory, partial inventory, complete inventory, and cover type inventory. A specific problem inventory gathers data on one particular problem such as looking at the effects of Hemlock Woolly Adelgid or Dutch elm disease. A partial inventory uses sampling where only a subset of the trees in the community are observed to draw inferences on the whole forest. A complete inventory collects data from all trees in the population, and a cover type survey is a survey where some of the information gathered is usually done through aerial photography and GIS systems. This type of survey is being increasingly used in urban areas. These inventories are generally conducted by student groups and volunteers, or contracted to urban forestry consultants, or by municipal urban foresters using either handwritten methods, software, templates, or PDAs.
