= Beam steering =

Changing the direction of the main lobe of a radiation pattern

Beam steering is a technique for changing the direction of the main lobe of a radiation pattern. Beam tilt is used in radio to aim the main lobe of the vertical plane radiation pattern of an antenna below (or above) the horizontal plane.

== Radio and radar ==
In radio and radar systems, beam steering may be accomplished by switching the antenna elements or by changing the relative phases of the RF signals driving the elements. As a result, this directs the transmit signal towards an intended receiver. In recent days, beam steering is playing a significant role in 5G communication because of quasi-optic nature of 5G frequencies.

The simplest method beam tilt is mechanical beam tilt, where the antenna is physically mounted in such a manner as to lower the angle of the signal on one side. However, this also raises it on the other side, making it useful in only very limited situations.

Horizontal and vertical radiation patterns, the latter with a pronounced downward beam tilt

More common is electrical beam tilt, where the phasing between antenna elements is tweaked to make the signal go down (usually) in all directions. This is extremely useful when the antenna is at a very high point, and the edge of the signal is likely to miss the target (broadcast audience, cellphone users, etc.) entirely.

With electrical tilting, front and back lobes tilt in the same direction. For example, an electrical downtilt will make both the front lobe and the back lobe tilt down. This is the property used in the above example where the signal is pointed down in all directions. On the contrary, mechanical downtilting will make the front lobe tilt down and the back lobe tilt up. In almost all practical cases, antennas are only tilted down – though tilting up is technically possible.

The use of purely electrical tilt with no mechanical tilt is an attractive choice for aesthetic reasons which are very important for operators seeking acceptance of integrated antennas in visible locations.

In GSM and UMTS cellular networks, mechanical tilt is almost always fixed whereas electrical tilt can be controlled using remote actuators and position sensors, thus reducing operating expenses. Remote electrical tilt is abbreviated as RET and it is part of the Antenna Interface Standards Group's open specification for the control interface of antenna devices.

Occasionally, mechanical and electrical tilt will be used together in order to create greater beam tilt in one direction than the other, mainly to accommodate unusual terrain. Along with null fill, beam tilt is the essential parameter controlling the focus of radio communications, and together they can create almost infinite combinations of 3-D radiation patterns for any situation.

=== Beam tilt optimization ===
Beam tilt optimization is a network optimization technique used in mobile networks aiming at controlling the inclination of the vertical tilt angle of the antenna in order to optimize a set of network performance indicators.

Different studies in beam tilt optimization focus on Coverage-Capacity Optimization (CCO), for which the goal is to control the beam tilt in order to jointly optimize the radio coverage and capacity in the network cells and reduce interference from neighbouring cells.

There exists mainly two types of approaches to beam tilt optimization:

1. Rule-based algorithms: consist of optimization strategies based on domain knowledge and control theory, and mainly based on the optimization of utility metrics, or threshold-based policies employing Fuzzy Logic (FL) to model representative network performance indicators.
2. Data-driven algorithms : consist of optimization strategies based on the use learning techniques based on the availability of network data (e.g. Contextual Bandit (CB) techniques), or by directly interacting with the environment (e.g. Reinforcement Learning (RL) techniques)

== Acoustics ==
In acoustics, beam steering is used to direct the audio from loudspeakers to a specific location in the listening area. This is done by changing the magnitude and phase of two or more loudspeakers installed in a column where the combined sound is added and cancelled at the required position. Commercially, this type of loudspeaker arrangement is known as a line array. This technique has been around for many years but since the emergence of modern digital signal processing (DSP) technology there are now many commercially available products on the market. Beam steering and directivity Control using DSP was pioneered in the early 1990s by Duran Audio who launched a technology called DDC (Digital Directivity Control).

== Optical system ==
In optical systems, beam steering may be accomplished by changing the refractive index of the medium through which the beam is transmitted or by the use of mirrors, prisms, lenses, or rotating diffraction gratings. Examples of optical beam steering approaches include mechanical mirror-based gimbals or beam-director units, galvanometer mechanisms that rotate mirrors, Risley prisms, phased-array optics, and microelectromechanical systems using micro-mirrors.

== Beam Steering Applications and Emerging Techniques ==
The scope of beam-steering technologies has broadened significantly with innovations that serve both traditional applications and emerging demands in fields such as satellite communication, radar, and 5G networks. Traditional methods like parabolic reflectors and phased arrays are now complemented by Reflectarray (RA) and Transmitarray (TA) antennas. These designs serve as high-gain, planar alternatives with advantages in cost, efficiency, and scalability, meeting modern requirements for compact and lightweight systems. One of the latest approaches in beam steering involves Near-Field Meta-Steering (NFMS), which uses phase-gradient metasurfaces placed in close proximity to a feed antenna. This method achieves 3D beam steering by employing compact structures that allow wide-angle control over both elevation and azimuth, proving highly effective for systems where space and profile height are restricted.

Beam steering has also found essential applications in high-speed, interference-free communication for defense and civilian markets. Satellite-based communication systems, for example, require dual-band beam-steering capabilities to handle uplink and downlink data streams simultaneously. The development of beam-steering antennas for Satellite Communication on the Move (SOTM) systems highlights the need for antennas that are not only efficient but also lightweight, low-profile, and cost-effective. Challenges remain, including addressing cost constraints and achieving higher scanning speeds and wider bandwidths.

== See also ==
- Beamforming
- Electron optics
- Phased array
