= Pulp and paper industry in Japan =

Japan is the third country in the world in production of paper (2011 figures). The leading Japanese company in the field (2015) is Oji Paper, with three other Japanese companies – Sumitomo Forestry, Nippon Paper Group, and Unicharm – also in the world top 20.

== See also ==
- Pulp and paper industry
- Environmental issues with paper
