= Tree taper =

Tree taper is the degree to which a tree's stem or bole decreases in diameter as a function of height above ground. Within Forestry and for the purposes of timber production, trees with a high degree of taper are said to have poor form, while those with low taper have good form. The opposite is the case for open-grown amenity trees. The form of a tree is sometimes quantified by the Girard form class, which is the ratio, expressed as a percentage, of the butt-log scaling diameter to diameter at breast height.

Taper is often represented by mathematical functions fitted to empirical data, called taper equations. One such function, attributed to Ormerod, is

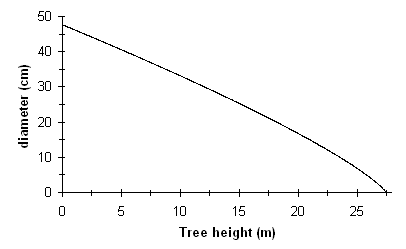
Tree taper equation

$d(h)^2 = {D^2} \left({H-h \over H-h_b}\right)^{1.6}$

where:

$d(h)$ = stem diameter at height h,

$D$ = tree diameter at breast height,

$H$ = tree total height,

$h$ height of interest (h ≤ H), and

$h_b$ = breast height.

Once developed, taper equations can be used to predict the diameter at a given height, or the height for a given diameter.

== See also ==
- Judson Freeman Clark#International 1/4-inch log rule
