= Line plot survey =

Line plot survey is a systematic sampling technique used on land surfaces for laying out sample plots within a rectangular grid to conduct forest inventory or agricultural research. It is a specific type of systematic sampling, similar to other statistical sampling methods such as random sampling, but more straightforward to carry out in practice.

This survey methodology is typically used to collect information about seedlings, shrubs, invasive species, signs of wildlife, need for fertilization, timber species count, and other similar types of data. For statistical control, all sample plots are a precise radius, typically 4 to 8 feet (120 to 240 cm), and must not include features outside each sampling circle.

== Method ==
Line plot survey layout

The method is commonly used for forest inventories. It makes it possible to accurately estimate the volume standing in a forested tract without counting every single item. Inventory specialists set up a line bearing on their hand compass and determine how many plots to take on this survey line. This is done by determining the distance between survey lines (B), the distance between plots (D), and the surface area (A) of the tract. The number of samples that should be taken is then calculated as follows:

$$n= \frac{A \times 10}{B \times D}$$

The survey starts with the surveyor selecting two random numbers between [0 and B] and [0 and D] for the first plot and line location. The surveyor then measures the length to the first plot, surveys, and repeats the procedure. Once at the boundary, the surveyor turns 90° and continues on to the next transect.

== Uses ==
The line plot survey has the advantage of ensuring the inventory incorporates an even outlay and includes everything in the forested tract. Examples of this are stand regeneration surveys to assess what is growing in a forest. Transect azimuth of 300° using plots one chain apart in one tenth acre then perhaps moving four chains to the next plot while still on the 300° (degree) bearing.
