= Ecological thinning =

Forest management technique

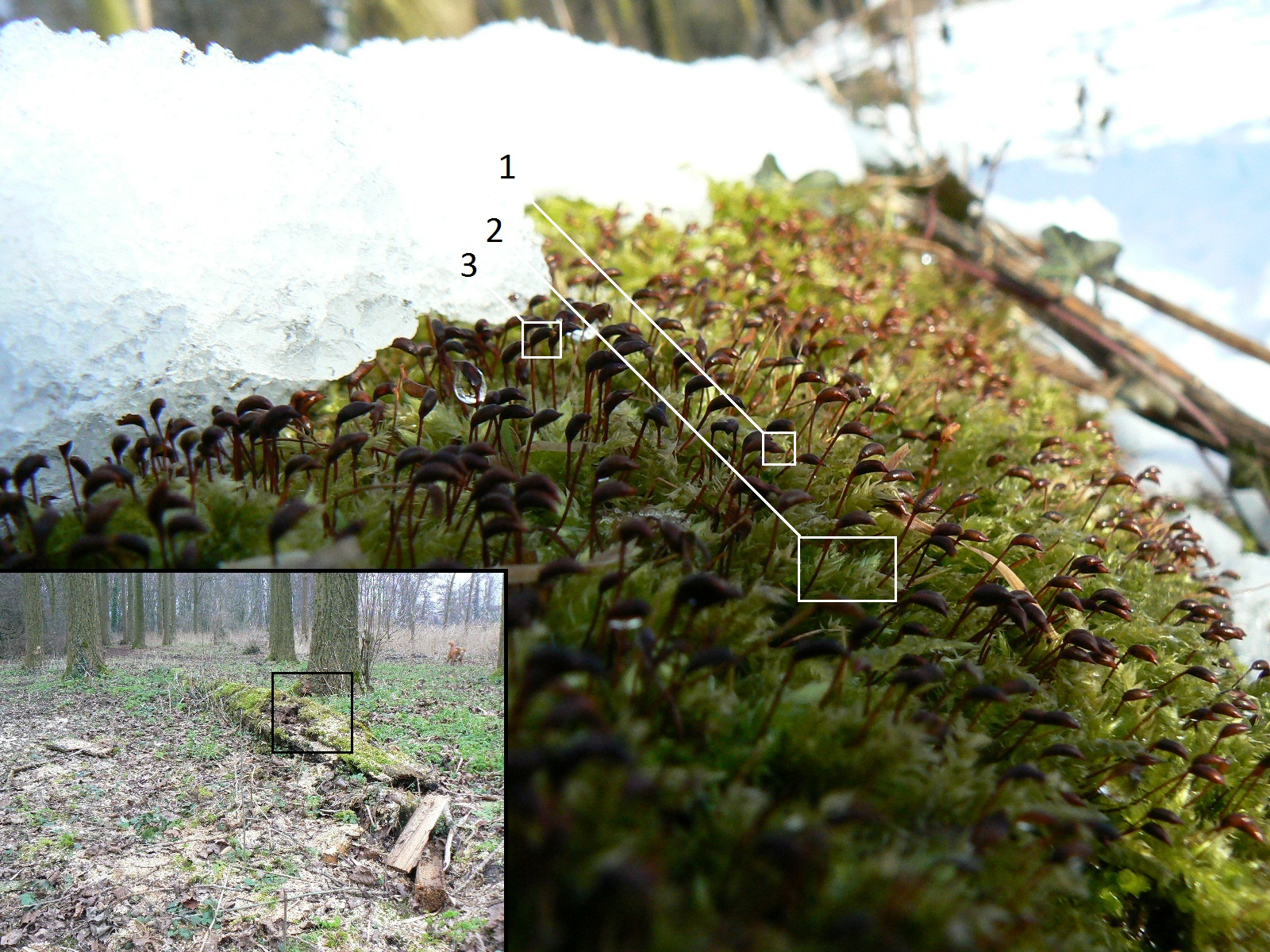
Fresh snow partially covers epixylic Rough-stalked Feather-moss (Brachythecium rutabulum), growing on a dead hybrid black poplar (Populus x canadensis), thinned in 2008 to create a waterside path. The last stage of the moss lifecycle is shown, where the sporophytes are visible before dispersion of their spores: the calyptra (1) is still attached to the sporangium (2). The tops of the gametophytes (3) can be discerned as well. Inset shows the surrounding, black poplars growing on sandy loam on the bank of a kolk, with the detail area marked.

Ecological thinning is a silvicultural technique used in forest management that involves cutting trees to improve functions of a forest other than timber production.

Although thinning originated as a man-made forest management tool, aimed at increasing timber yields, the shift from production forests to multifunctional forests brought with it the cutting of trees to manipulate an ecosystem for various reasons, ranging from removing non-native species from a plot to removing poplars growing on a riverside beach aimed at recreational use.

Since the 1970s, leaving the thinned trees on the forest floor has become an increasingly common policy: wood can be decomposed in a more natural fashion, playing an important role in increasing biodiversity by providing habitat to various invertebrates, birds and small mammals. Many fungi (e.g. Calocera viscosa) and mosses are saproxylic or epixylic as well (e.g. Marchantiophyta) – some moss species completing their entire life-cycle on a single log.

Where trees are managed under a commercial regime, competition is reduced by removing adjacent stems that exhibit less favourable timber quality potential. When left in a natural state trees will "self-thin", but this process can be unreliable in some circumstances. Examples of this can be found in the Buxus–Ironbark forests and woodlands of Victoria (Australia) where a large proportion of trees are coppice, resultant from timber cutting in decades gone by.

== Ecophysiological repercussions ==
Thinning decreases canopy closure and increases the penetration of solar radiation into the canopy. The photosynthetic efficiency of this energy is improved, and needle retention is prolonged, especially in the lower parts of the crown. The root system, crown length, crown diameter, and crown area all increase after thinning. Even if soil evaporation and individual tree transpiration increases after thinning, total evapo-transpiration at stand level tends to decrease; canopy water interception is reduced and throughfall increased, so that tree-water status usually improves after thinning.

Radial annual growth is an integrative index of tree physiological response to environmental variation. Working with Norway spruce, which can be expected to behave in some respects similarly to white spruce, Misson et al. showed that a reduction in stand density alters the classical climate–growth relationship. At individual tree level, thinning could be used to increase tree resistance to drought stress. Nevertheless, this effect is limited when site conditions are limiting. Misson et al. concluded that heavy thinning should be applied when forest decline is expected from drought stress. Furthermore, stands on dry sites should be thinned more heavily because such sites cannot support high-density stands.

Aussenac, also working with Norway spruce, investigated the response to thinning. Thinning altered the temporal evolution of radial growth at all frequencies in radial growth chronologies. Previous studies had shown, not surprisingly, that thinning decreases the canopy closure and encourages solar radiation to penetrate the canopy. Solar energy then becomes more important inside the crown. The improved photosynthetic efficiency of this energy influences the retention time of needles, especially in the lower part of the crown. Furthermore, the length, diameter, and area, of the crown, and the size of the root system all increase after thinning.

These modifications at the crown level influence photosynthate production positively as long as water supply is not limiting. Even if soil evaporation and individual tree transpiration are more important after thinning, total evapo-transpiration at stand level tends to decrease. Furthermore, with the reduced importance of leaf area index (LAI), thinning reduces canopy water interception and increases throughfall. This explains why the soil moisture content increases in a thinned stand. Thus, during the vegetation period, tree-water status is usually better in a thinned stand than in a high-density stand.

For semi-tolerant species such as Norway spruce and white spruce, solar energy is less limiting than for intolerant species. This can account for the exponential relationship found by Misson et al. between thinning intensity and mean radial growth. Only when thinning was relatively severe did important radial growth variation occur. Furthermore, the ecophysiological advantage of an improved water supply could be counterbalanced by limiting site conditions.

For Norway spruce in the Belgian Ardennes, Misson et al. recommended that stand basal area should not exceed 26 m^{2}/ha on a dry site, or 29 m^{2}/ha on a moist site if the objective is to maintain high long-term radial growth.

Misson et al. found that adaptations to thinning cover a continuous range of different time scales, with long-, medium-, and short-term growth variations being controlled by very different internal factors influenced by the environment. Misson et al. ascribed what they called long- and medium-term radial growth variation of individual trees mainly to structural adaptation, such as enlargement of the crown or the root system. Short-term radial growth variations, on the other hand, were considered to be due mainly to physiological acclimatisation, with response to factors such as stomatal conductance regulation, variation of photosynthetic capacity, and respiration. Nevertheless, it is clear that the adaptations are linked, and that radial growth is the integrative response of this mutual inter-relationship.

== Research ==
Research programs under way in various parts of the world (e.g. United States and Australia) are aimed at providing an alternate approach in forest management where conservation objectives are a high priority. Methods of ecological thinning being developed on silvicultural techniques for local forest types. Ecological thinning is being developed using two principles: 1. appropriate stem reduction to reduce competition and 2. retention of trees (selection) that are more suitable for wildlife (i.e. not timber production). An example of ecological thinning research is the project in Victoria's Box-Ironbark forests, investigating various thinning and timber removal methods under an adaptive management or AEM framework. The primary objective is to generate (over time) a number of forest habitat values (i.e. tree hollows) that are crucial for wildlife conservation.

== See also ==
- Habitat conservation
