= Angle gauge =

Tool used by foresters

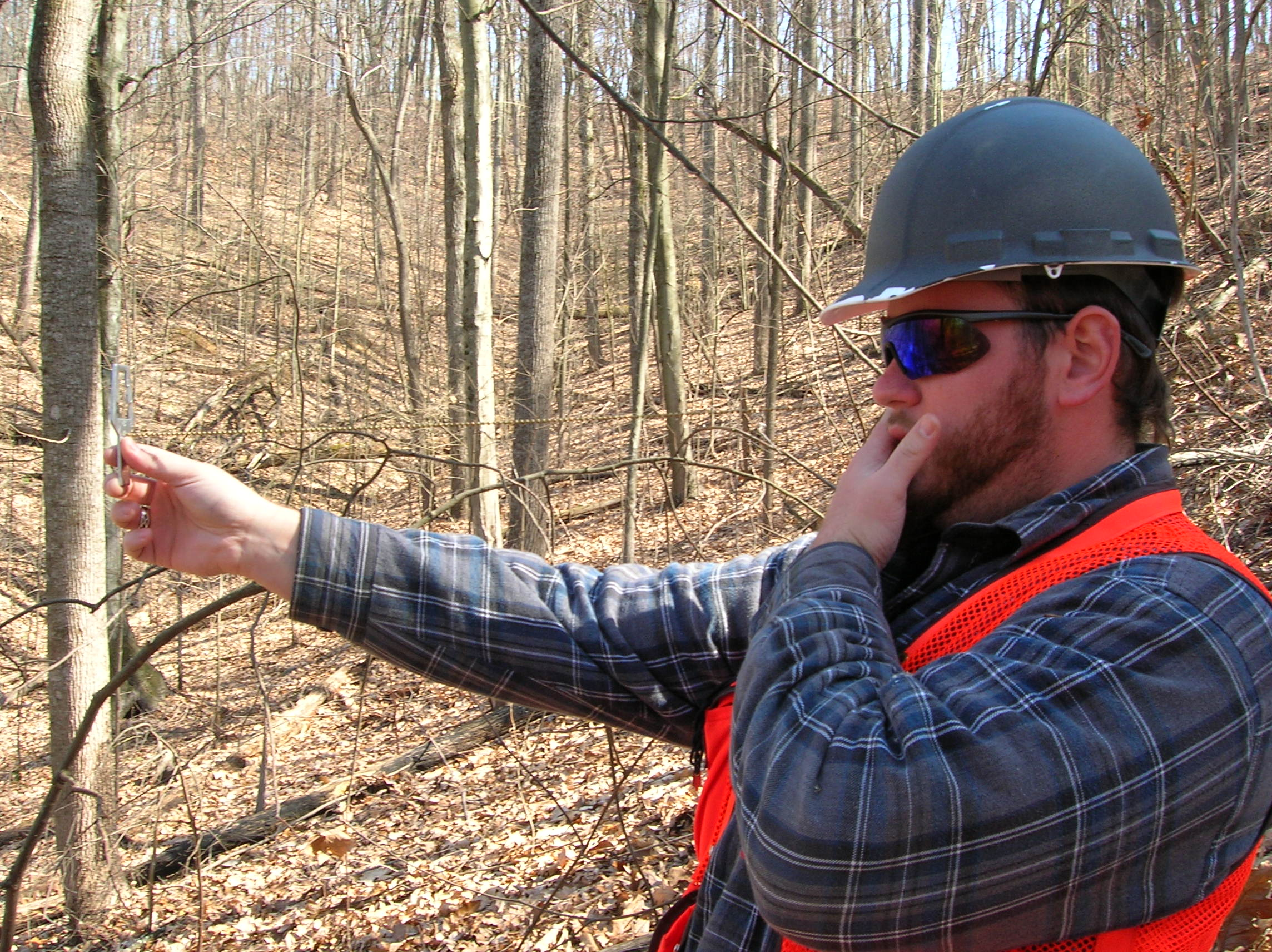
Proper use of angle gauge to count in trees

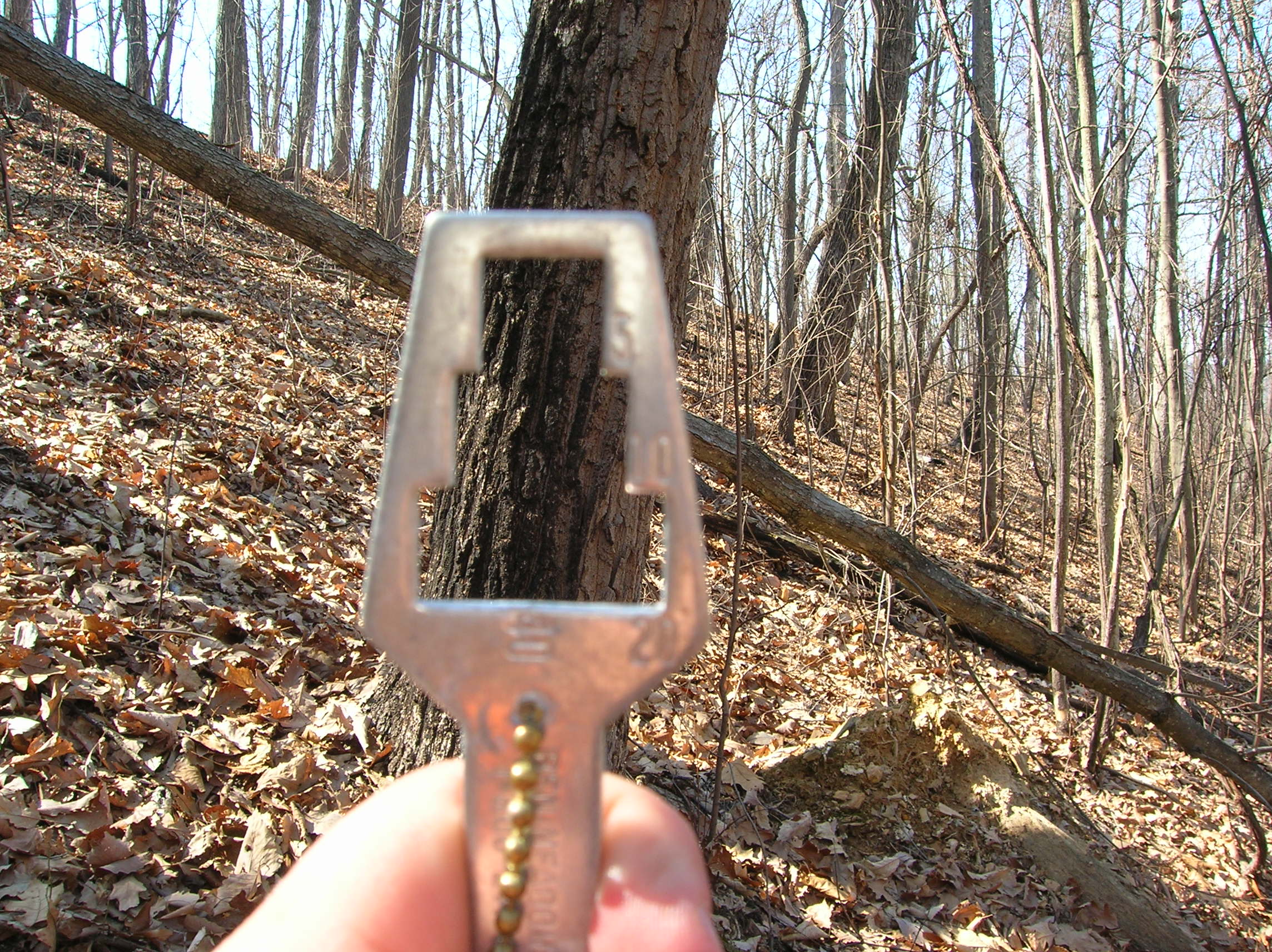
Angle gauge indicating a tree to measure for a basal area factor of 10

An angle gauge is a tool used by foresters to determine which trees to measure when using a variable radius plot design in forest inventory. Using this tool a forester can quickly measure the trees that are in or out of the plot. An angle gauge is similar to a wedge prism though it must be held a fixed distance from the eye to work properly. Unlike the wedge prism, which is held over the plot center, the surveyor's eye is kept over plot-center when using an angle gauge.

== Use ==
When using an angle gauge the user must count trees that are larger than the width of the angle gauge, as viewed from the center of the plot. The angle gauge is held a set distance from the eye of the surveyor. Most angle gauges have a string or chain that lets the user know the set distance. Each angle gauge is set at a certain basal area factor (BAF). Each tree that is in the plot represents this number, the BAF, of square footage. It is multiplied by the number of trees on the plot to give basal area per acre. In the United States BAF is measured in units of square feet. For example, using a BAF 10 angle gauge a forester measures 12 trees that are in trees. Therefore, this plot represents 120 sq ft/acre (28 m^{2}/ha).

== Borderline trees ==
Some trees are on the borderline of the plot and must be checked to be sure they are to be included. The limiting distance must be calculated to see if the trees are in or out. The equation to calculate the limiting distance in feet is diameter at breast height, DBH, in inches times plot radius factor, PRF, in feet/area D_{lim} = DBH×PRF.

For example, using a BAF 10 angle gauge a forester needs to know the limiting distance for a 20-inch (510 mm) tree. The PRF using a 10 BAF angle gauge is 2.75 feet (0.84 m) for every inch of tree diameter. Therefore, 20 inches × 2.75 ft/inch = 55 feet (17 m). This means that a 20-inch (510 mm) tree must be over 55 feet (17 m) away from the center of the plot using a BAF 10 angle gauge to be out of the plot.
