= Increment borer =

Tool used to extract wood tissue from a living tree without killing it

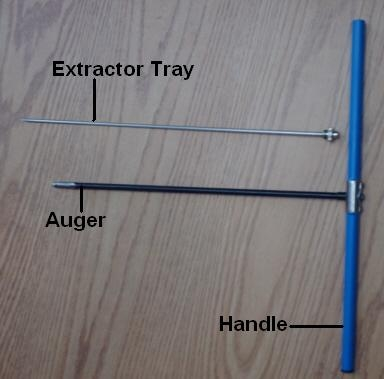
Haglof increment borer

An increment borer is a dendrological tool used to extract a section of wood tissue from a living tree with relatively minor injury to the plant itself. The tool consists of a handle, an auger bit and a small, half circular metal tray ( the core extractor or "spoon") that fits into the auger bit; the last is usually manufactured from carbide steel. It is most often used by foresters, researchers and scientists to determine the age of a tree. The operation enables the user to count the rings in the core sample, to reveal the age of the tree being examined and its growth rate. After use the tool is divided into parts and the auger bit and extractor fit within the handle, making it highly compact and easy to carry.

== Use ==
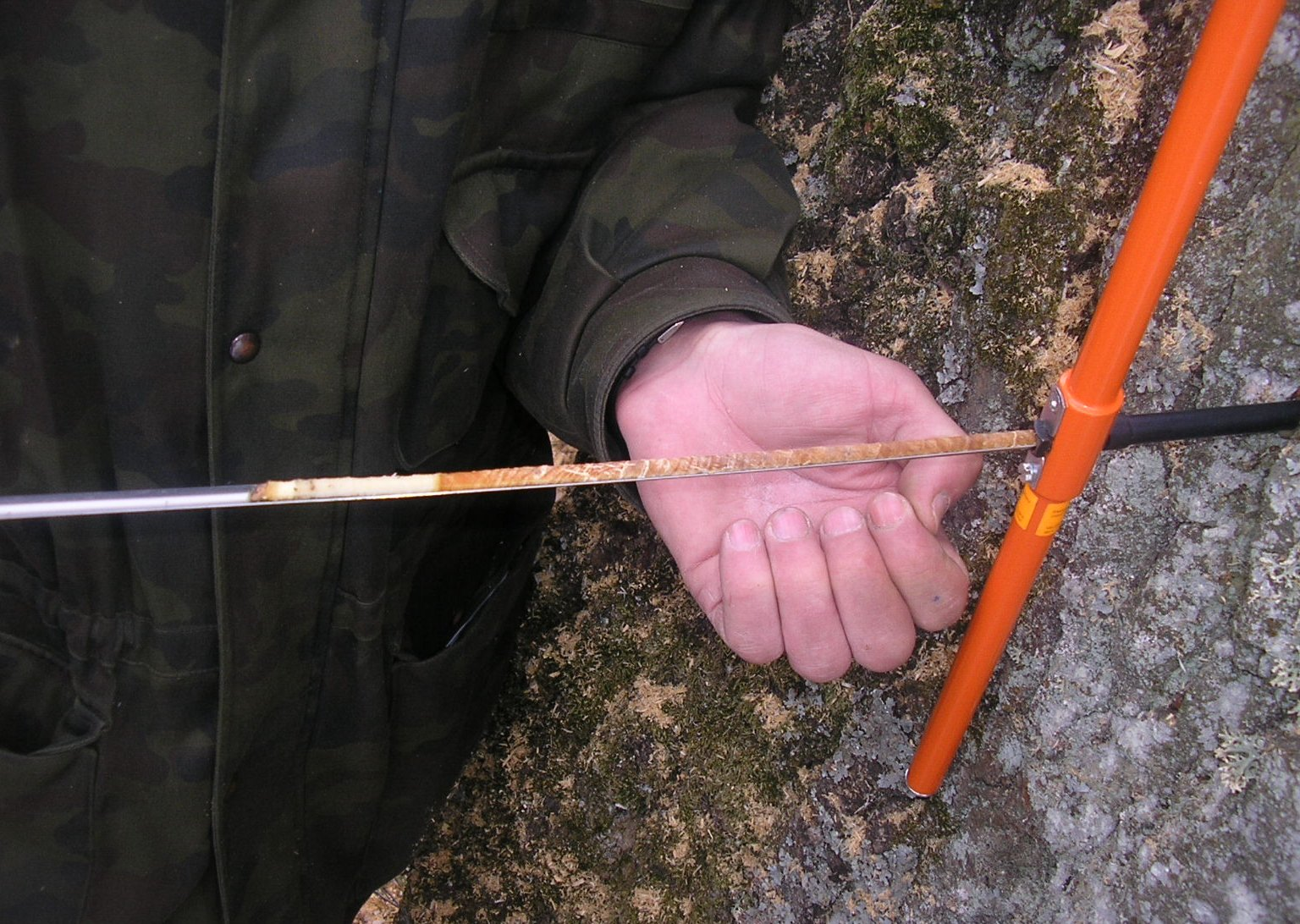
An extracted core sample

Effective use of an increment borer requires specialized training. Samples are taken at breast height or stump height of the tree trunk, depending on the user's objectives; during use the borer should be well lubricated, thus making it easier to use and preventing it from becoming stuck in the wood.

== Maintenance ==
As with any other tools, increment borers should be properly maintained to keep them in good working condition; should be thoroughly cleaned after each use and dried before storing. Sharpening kits are available and should be used regularly, before such bits become dull.

== Types ==
Increment borers come in different lengths and diameters and have different types of threads. The most common diameters are the 4, 4.3, and 5.15 millimeter borers in the range of 3.8 millimeters to 12 millimeters, and they are available with two or three threads. The two-threaded type is more appropriate for hard woods, because it cuts at a slower rate, which applies more torque. The three-threaded auger will penetrate the wood at a faster rate than the former.
