= Girard form class =

Girard form class is a form quotient calculated as the ratio of diameter inside bark at the top of the first 16-foot log to the diameter outside bark at breast height (DBH). Its purpose is to estimate board-foot volume of whole trees from measurement of DBH, estimation of the number of logs, and estimation of the taper of the first log, based on the general relationships identified between the taper of the first log and the taper of subsequent logs. Girard form class is the primary expression of tree form in the United States.

To allow for log trimming and a 1-foot stump height the diameter inside bark is measured at 17.3 feet above the ground. The closer the form class value to 100 the closer the log resembles a cylinder, where a value of 100 means the log is very nearly a cylinder.

Volume tables using Girard form class are composite tables and are created independently of tree species. The volume tables may be corrected where systemic errors are identified, and modified GFC volume tables are available for conifers in the northeast, outside of the original study area.

Girard form class assumes a large minimum merchantable top diameter (40% for large trees, such that a 40” tree would have a top diameter of 16”), and the tables will overestimate if additional logs are counted to smaller diameters commonly utilized by modern mills.

To calculate GFC, you need several things: DIB (Diameter inside bark) @ 17.3', DOB (diameter outside bark) @ 17.3', DBH (diameter @ 4.5'), and [single] bark thickness (which will be used to calculate double bark thickness).

Example:
Bark Thickness = .56"
Double Bark Thickness = 1.12"
DOB @ 17.3' = 18.2"
DIB @ 17.3' = 17.08" (18.2" - 1.12")
DBH = 21.9"

((17.08")/(21.9")) * 100 = 77.99%, therefore the volume table for GFC 78 will be used as the basis of estimating volume

== See also ==
- Judson Freeman Clark#International 1/4-inch log rule
