= Forest stand =

Forest area of distinct characteristics

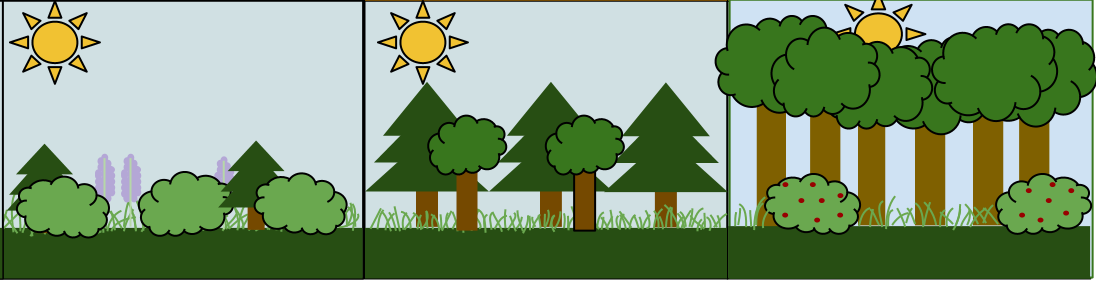
Three forest stands

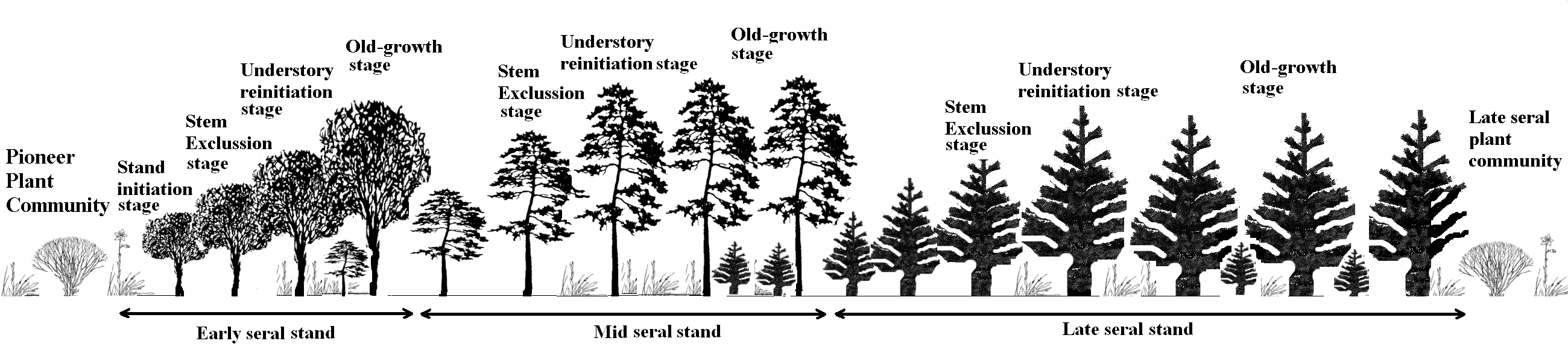
Stand dynamics stages during succession.

A forest stand is a contiguous community of trees sufficiently uniform in composition, structure, age, size, class, distribution, spatial arrangement, condition, or location on a site of uniform quality to distinguish it from adjacent communities.

A forest is a "collection of stands" also utilizing the practices of forestry. Stand level modelling is a type of modelling in the forest sciences in which the main unit is a forested stand.

== Stand description ==
A forest stand is commonly described in 10ths or 10%s. Thus, one could describe a mixed stand of 3 Ponderosa pines, 2 mangrove trees, and 5 silver spruces by the proportions of the three species. If more than 80% of the main canopy is the same species, it is a pure stand. If it is less than 80% it is considered a mixed stand.

The form of mixing of the tree types is commonly given as:

- individuals – when there are a few unconnected trees of a type.
- troop – up to 5 trees connected of one type.
- group – when there are more than 5 trees, but they are shorter than a harvestable tree.
- thicket – when there are more than 5 trees, but they are taller than a harvestable tree to around 0.5 ha.
- rotten group (cluster) – a packed together standing aggregate of trees, trees in the rotten group have different heights and different depths or a stripwise arrangement. Rotten is from German, Rotte and means pack. These trees are linked together in small rotten groups separated by bigger interstices. This means they are ideal for mountain afforestation.

Forest stands are often created through disturbances. These disturbances fall along spectrums of magnitude, size and frequency. Some examples include wildfire, windstorms, insects, harvesting timber and livestock grazing. After a disturbance occurs, a new cohort(s) can fill the new growing space and through various metrics, be delineated as a new stand.

== Stand spacing ==
A stand's spacing may be described by the crown cover of the trees. It can thus be delimited as:

- Packed – the crowns all overlap when looked at from above
- Closed – the crowns all touch, but do not overlap
- Light – when there is space between the crowns that is even
- Spacey/gappy – when a few trees are close and yet there are many clearings between these little groups

== Purpose ==
Stands are not logical, ecologically defined management units. Instead they have evolved from the Normalwald concept, which was predicated on the idea of harvesting efficiency and thus that forest land was primarily to generate income from timber production. Stands allow easier forest inventory and planning. The concept has by way of extension been applied across all forestry practice in the world, but originated in the Mitteleuropa of the late 18th and early 19th century with the mercantilist tradition, Prussian education and emergence of modern silviculture.

Along with the Normalwald concept has come the idea that stands are standardized in terms of size, species mix, age class and other tree metrics and that forestry should aim to impose this on nature where it has not existed up till now.

== Alternatives ==
As stand is from an economic timber forestry perspective, it is very focused on the tree element of forests. It is not considerate of the other elements within a forest such as shrubs, animals or topography and alternative terms may better fit ecological or other land value purposes within forests. The English term grove is one example. Also proposed is eco-unit. Other terms may also work, but be on different scales, such as copse or woodland. To be useful in silviculture such terms must be clearly defined and consistently applied. Lacking that stand is likely to remain the preferred unit to be used by foresters and others managing forests, despite its limitations.

== See also ==
- Bosquet, a formal plantation of trees
- Coppicing, method of tree management
  - copse in Wiktionary
- Grove (nature), small group of trees
- Thicket, a dense stand of trees
- Forest dynamics
- stand in Wiktionary
- Stand (disambiguation)
