= Basal area =

Cross-sectional area of tree stems

Basal area is the cross-sectional area of trees at breast height (1.3m or 4.5 ft above ground). It is a common way to describe stand density. In forest management, basal area usually refers to merchantable timber and is given on a per hectare or per acre basis. If one cut down all the merchantable trees on an acre at 4.5 feet (1.4 m) off the ground and measured the square inches on the top of each stump (πr*r), added them all together and divided by square feet (144 sq inches per square foot), that would be the basal area on that acre. In forest ecology, basal area is used as a relatively easily-measured surrogate of total forest biomass and structural complexity, and change in basal area over time is an important indicator of forest recovery during succession .

== Estimation from diameter at breast height ==
The basal area (BA) of a tree can be estimated from its diameter at breast height (DBH), the diameter of the trunk as measured 1.3m (4.5 ft) above the ground. DBH is converted to BA based on the formula for the area of a circle:

$BA =\pi \times (DBH/2)^2$

If $DBH$ was measured in cm, $BA$ will be in cm^{2}. To convert to m^{2}, divide by 10,000:

$BA(m^2) = \frac{\pi \times (DBH(cm)/2)^2}{10000}$

If $DBH$ is in inches, divide by 144 to convert to ft^{2}:

$BA(ft^2) = \frac{\pi \times (DBH(inches)/2)^2}{144}$

The formula for BA in ft^{2} may also be simplified as:

$BA(ft^2) = 0.005454 \times DBH(in)^2$ in English system

$BA(m^2) = 0.00007854 \times DBH(cm)^2$ in Metric system

The basal area of a forest can be found by adding the basal areas (as calculated above) of all of the trees in an area and dividing by the area of land in which the trees were measured. Basal area is generally made for a plot and then scaled to m^{2}/ha or ft^{2}/acre to compare forest productivity and growth rate among multiple sites.

== Estimation using a wedge prism ==
A wedge prism can be used to quickly estimate basal area per hectare. To find basal area using this method, simply multiply your BAF (Basal Area Factor) by the number of "in" trees in your variable radius plot. The BAF will vary based on the prism used, common BAFs include 5/8/10, and all "in" trees are those trees, when viewed through your prism from plot centre, that appear to be in-line with the standing tree on the outside of the prism.

== Worked example ==
Suppose you carried out a survey using a variable radius plot with angle count sampling (wedge prism) and you selected a Basal Area Factor (BAF) of 4. If your first tree had a diameter at breast height (DBH) of 14cm, then the standard way of calculating how much of 1ha was covered by tree area (scaling up from that tree to the hectare) would be:

(BAF/((DBH+0.5)^{2} × π/4))) × 10,000

- BAF, in this case 4, is the BAF selected for the sampling technique.
- DBH, in this case 14 (this uses an assumed diameter, when actually used is the radius perpendicular to the tangent line)
- The + 0.5 allows under and over measurement to be accounted for.
- The π/4 converts the rest to the area.

In this case this means in every Ha there is 242 m^{2} of tree area according to this sampled tree being taken as representative of all the unmeasured trees.

== Fixed area plot ==
It would also be possible to survey the trees in a Fixed Area Plot (FAP). Also called a Fixed Radius Plot. In the case that this plot was 100 m^{2}. Then the formula would be

(DBH+0.5)^{2}X π/4
