= Outline of forestry =

Overview of and topical guide to forestry

The following outline is provided as an overview of and guide to forestry:

Forestry is the science and craft of creating, managing, planting, using, conserving and repairing forests and woodlands for associated resources for human and environmental benefits. Forestry is practiced in plantations and natural stands. The science of forestry has elements that belong to the biological, physical, social, political and managerial sciences. Forest management plays an essential role in creating and modifying habitats, and affects ecosystem services provisioning. A practitioner of forestry is a forester.

Below is a structured list of topics in forestry.

== Focus of forestry ==
- Tree – organism, whose species, age, vitality, growth, health, and size, are considered individually or more often, as part of a whole;

- Forest – defined as either a geographic area or delineated by the general composition of individuals;

- Biome – ecologically defined by its forest structure, leaf types, tree spacing, and climate

General Forested Biomes
Boreal

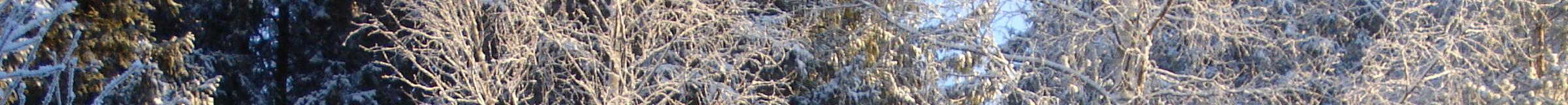
Taiga
Temperate

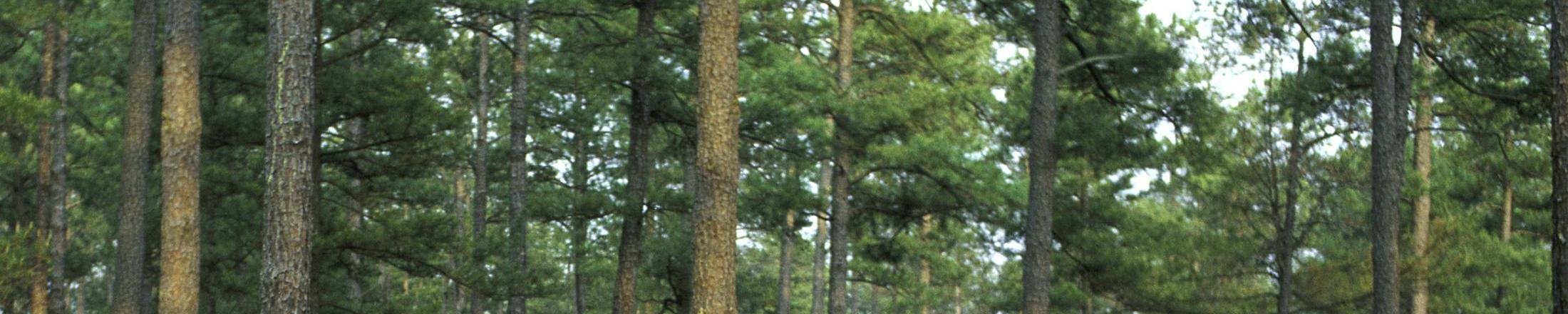
Coniferous

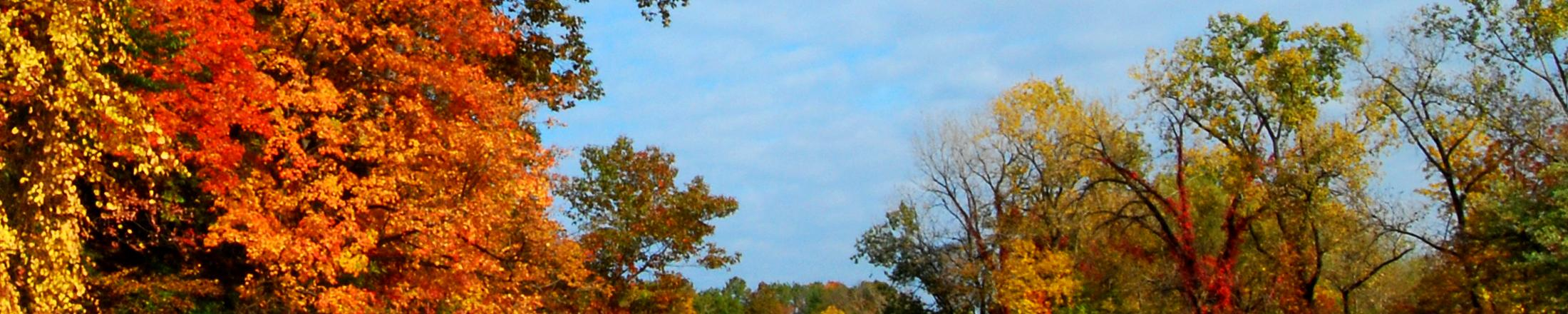
Broadleaf and mixed

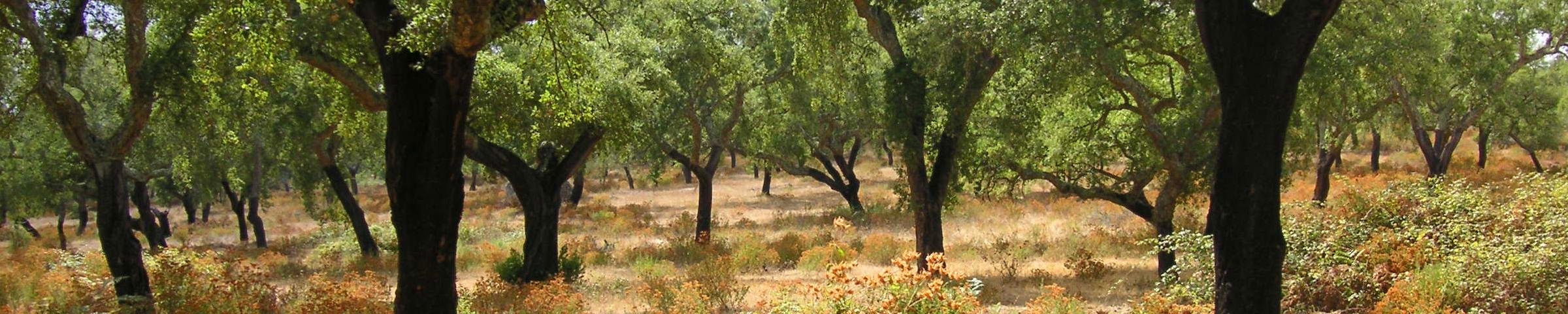
Mediterranean

Tropical/Subtropical

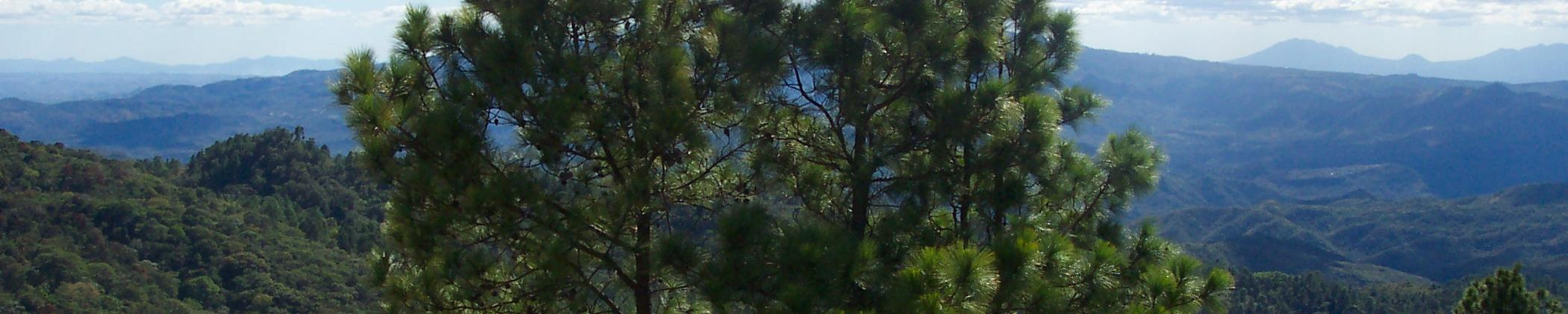
Coniferous

Moist broadleaf

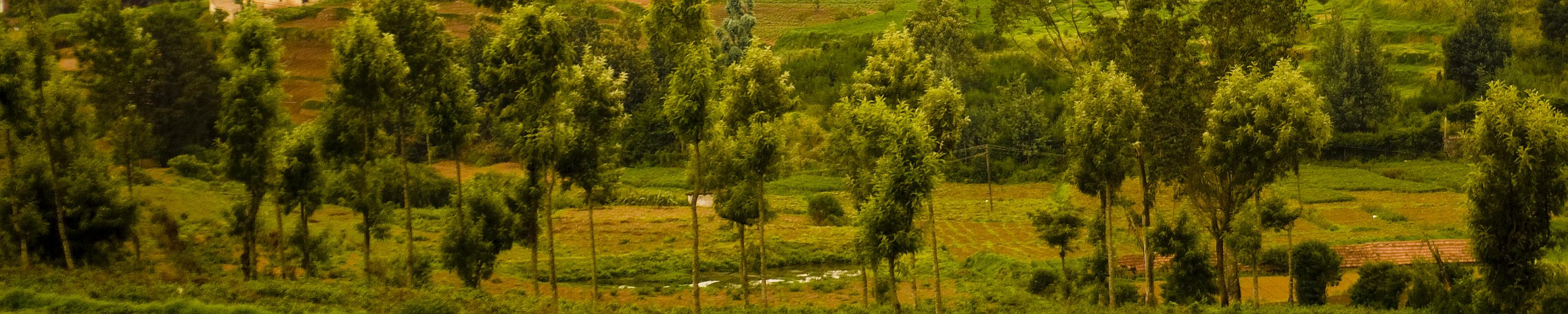
Dry broadleaf

Wetlands

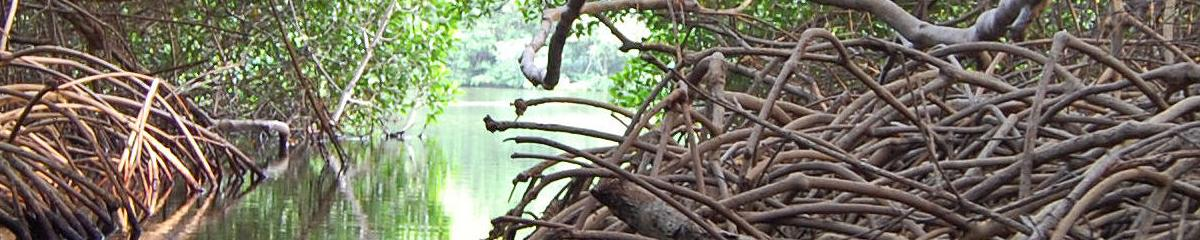
Mangroves

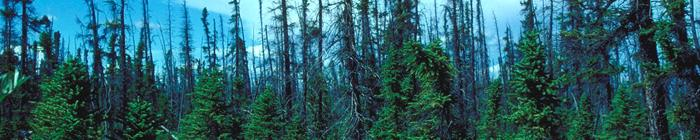
Bogs

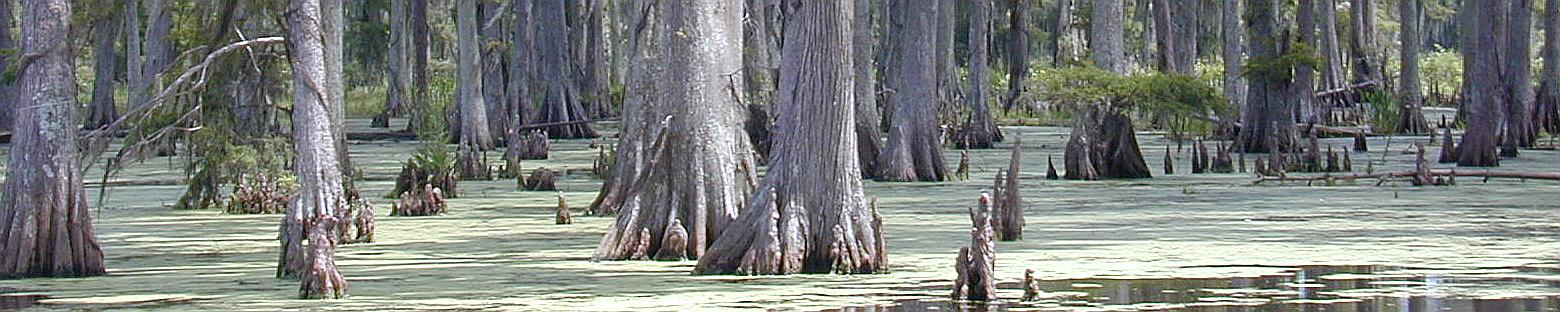
Swamps

Other

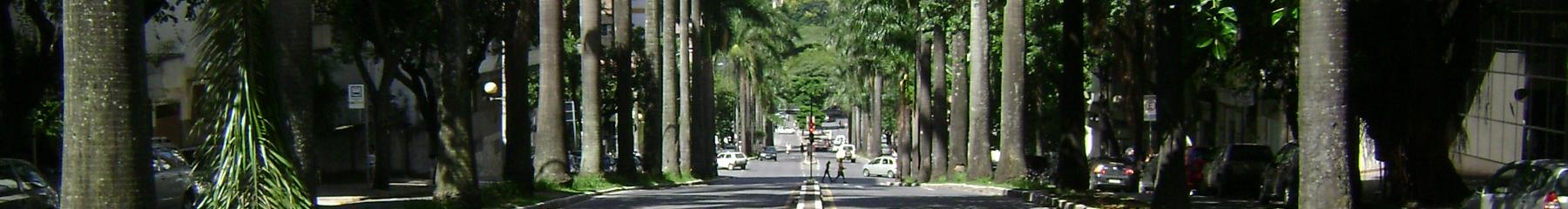
Urban

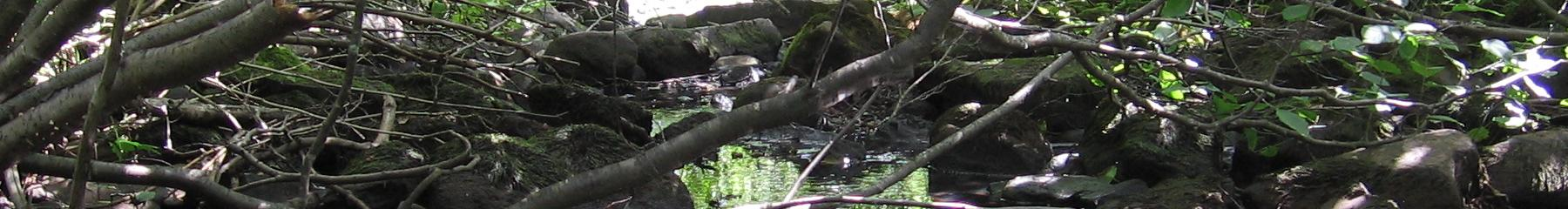
Riparian

== Branches of forestry ==
- Agroforestry – integration of forests into agricultural systems in order to optimize the production and positive effects within the system and minimize negative side effects of farming
- Boreal forestry – analyzes the particular challenges of forestry in the world's boreal regions
- Close to nature forestry – theory and practice that takes the forest as an ecosystem and manages it as such. It is based on reduced human intervention, that should be directed to accelerate the processes that nature would do by itself more slowly.
- Dendrology – involves the study and identification of economically useful tree species
- Forest ecology – studies the patterns and processes of a forest ecosystem
- Forest hydrology – embodies the effects of changes in forest land use on the movement, distribution, and quality of water in the ecosystem
- Forest pathology – study of diseases of woody plants, and of the interactions between trees and pathogens, pests, and other stressors that affect their health and function.
- Silviculture – is the art and science of controlling the establishment, growth, composition, health, and quality of forests to meet specific objectives
- Social forestry – addresses human-forest interactions, and the importance of community-based natural resource management
- Sustainable forestry – providing for the needs of society in the form of forest products while maintaining the health of forests and their mitigation of climate change and biodiversity loss through forestry practices that mimic natural patterns of disturbance and regeneration, such as balancing the numbers of trees by age, to provide a layered canopy and sustainable yield as an alternative to clear cutting. Sustaining natural forest habitats also involves preserving their water quality, and protecting them from wildfire, pests, and diseases.
- Tropical forestry – is particularly concerned with management and conservation of forests in the tropics
- Urban forestry – entails the care and management of urban tree populations for the purpose of improving the urban environment

=== Forest management ===
Forest management – comprises the overall administrative, economic, legal, and social aspects of forest regulation

- Analog forestry – a management focus that seeks to establish a tree-dominated ecosystem that is similar in architectural structure and ecological function to the naturally occurring climax and sub-climax vegetation community
- Bamboo forestry – farming and harvesting bamboo for commercial purposes such as construction.
- Community forestry – combination of forest conservation with rural development and poverty reduction objectives, accomplished through instating a legal framework that favors profitable and sustainable forest management
- Continuous cover forestry
- Ecoforestry – emphasizes practices which strive to protect and restore ecosystems
- Forest economics – studies the impact of economics on forest management decisions
- Energy forestry – includes specifically managing for the production of energy from biomass or biofuel derived from a fast-growing species of tree or woody shrub
  - Short rotation forestry – managing a forest that utilizes fast-growing species as a bio-based energy crop for use in power stations, alone or in combination with other fuels such as coal
    - Short rotation coppice (SRC) – focus on species that are able to naturally regenerate through stump sprouts to maximize economic productivity
- Hardwood timber production – process of managing stands of deciduous trees to maximize woody output

- Tree breeding – method of genetically modifying/selecting forest stock for improved growth or vigor characteristics

- Forest inventory – incorporates quantitative measurements of the forest stand to determine stand timber volume and productivity/health, and provides a basis off which management decisions can be made
- Mycoforestry – ecological forest management system implemented to enhance forest ecosystems and plant communities through the introduction of mycorrhizal and saprotrophic fungi
- Permaforestry – approach to the wildcrafting and harvesting of the forest biomass that uses cultivation to improve the natural harmonious systems. It is a relationship of interdependence between humans and the natural systems in which the amount of biomass available from the forest increases with the health of its natural systems.
- Sustainable forest management – emphasizes practices that maintain forest biodiversity, productivity, regeneration capacity, and vitality, while continuing to fulfill relevant ecological, economic and social functions
- Tree farming – timber crop production in a privately owned forest or woodland
  - Plantation forestry – industrial plantations are established to produce a high volume of wood in a short period of time. Some plantations are managed by state forestry authorities (for example, the Forestry Commission in Britain) and others by paper and wood companies (such as Weyerhaeuser, Rayonier and Plum Creek Timber in the United States, Asia Pulp & Paper in Indonesia).

== Types of trees and forests ==
- Types of trees
  - List of trees and shrubs by taxonomic family
    - List of tree species by shade tolerance – tree grouped by shade tolerance, a determinant in successional status
  - List of woods – commonly used in the timber and lumber trade
- Types of forests
  - By ecological factors (climate, composition, etc.)
    - Boreal forests (taiga) – occupy the subarctic zone and are generally evergreen and coniferous
      - Coniferous forests
    - Temperate forests – forests in temperate zones
      - Broadleaf forests, for example:
        - Temperate broadleaf and mixed forests
      - Evergreen coniferous forests, for example:
        - Temperate coniferous forests
        - Temperate rainforests
      - Broadleaf evergreen forests – supported in warm temperate zones. Examples include:
        - Laurel forests
    - Tropical and subtropical forests
      - Tropical and subtropical moist broadleaf forests
      - Tropical and subtropical dry broadleaf forests
      - Tropical and subtropical coniferous forests
    - By physical structure or developmental stage
      - Old growth forest
      - Secondary forest
    - By dominant tree species, for example
      - Ponderosa pine forests
      - Douglas-fir forests
  - List of types of formally designated forests – various institutionally designated types of forest areas, generally classified by use or ownership

== Geography of forests ==
- List of countries by forest area – using data from the CIA's World Factbook, presents the total area in km^{2} and the percentage of land covered by forests
- Lists of forests
  - List of old growth forests – by continent, country, province; with various descriptive information

=== Map of biomes ===
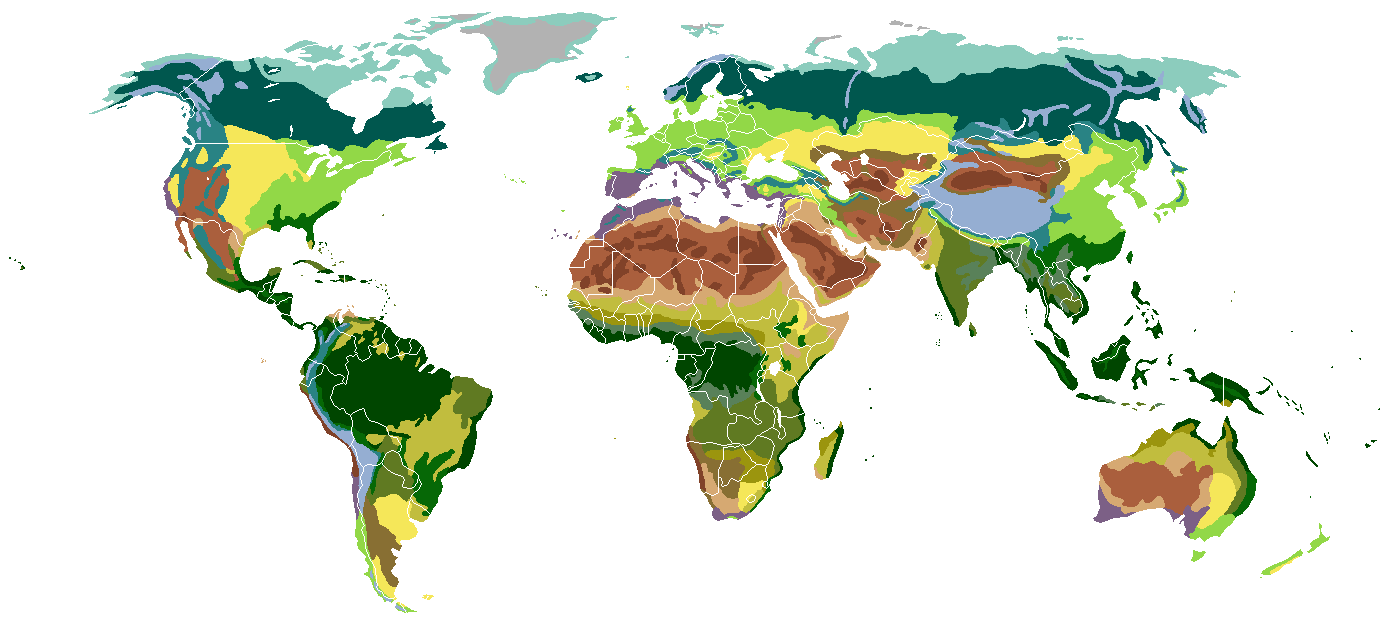
This map shows the locations of forest biomes (taiga, etc.) in relation to the other biomes of the world.: ice sheet and polar desert tundra taiga temperate broadleaf forest / Temperate steppe subtropical moist forest Mediterranean vegetation monsoon forest / arid desert xeric shrubland dry steppe Semiarid desert / grass savanna tree savanna subtropical dry forest tropical rainforest / alpine tundra mountain forest

- List of life zones by region

== Occupations in forestry ==
- Arborist – professional responsible for the maintenance of individual trees in an urban forest
  Two USFS foresters discussing firefighting tactics.
  also called a tree surgeon.
- Donkey puncher was the operator of a small steam donkey, a machine used in logging in the 19th and 20th centuries.
- Fire lookout – person assigned to spot for fires/smoke atop a fire lookout tower
- Forest ecologist – studies patterns, processes, flora and fauna in forest ecosystems
- Forest economist – model and analyze economic aspects of forest growth, utilization, and conservation
- Forest engineer – civil engineer specializing in all aspects of timber and forest operations, including road-building, railways, log transport, etc.
- Forest ranger – responsible for managing and policing human use of the forest; sometimes also acts as educator and interpreter
- Forest sociologist – applied social scientist working with a wide variety of stakeholders interested in forests
- Forest technician – individual primarily responsible for the marking of timber sales and on-ground land management, often requires a two-year Associate of Science degree
- Forester – professional chiefly responsible for the management of forests, requires a Bachelor of Science degree in most countries
  - Master forester – forestry expert responsible for forest management and training
- Hotshot crew/Handcrew – a group of wildland firefighters specialized in fire suppression tactics
- Lumberjack – the typical feller of trees and harvester of the lumber, duties can also include:

- Log bucking – delimbing and partitioning of trees into logs
- Log driving – transportation of logs on a river or lake downstream to the mill
- Log scaling – measurement of felled trees to determine the volume of wood going to the manufacturer

- Resin extractor – laborer who extracts resin from pine trees
- Rubber tapper – laborer who extracts natural rubber from tropical rubber trees
- Smokejumper – firefighters who parachute into remote areas to fight wildland fires
- Timber cruiser – responsible for assessing forest growth, health, and valuation
- Tree planters – help reestablish forests after logging, fires, and other events and circumstances

== Silvicultural methods ==
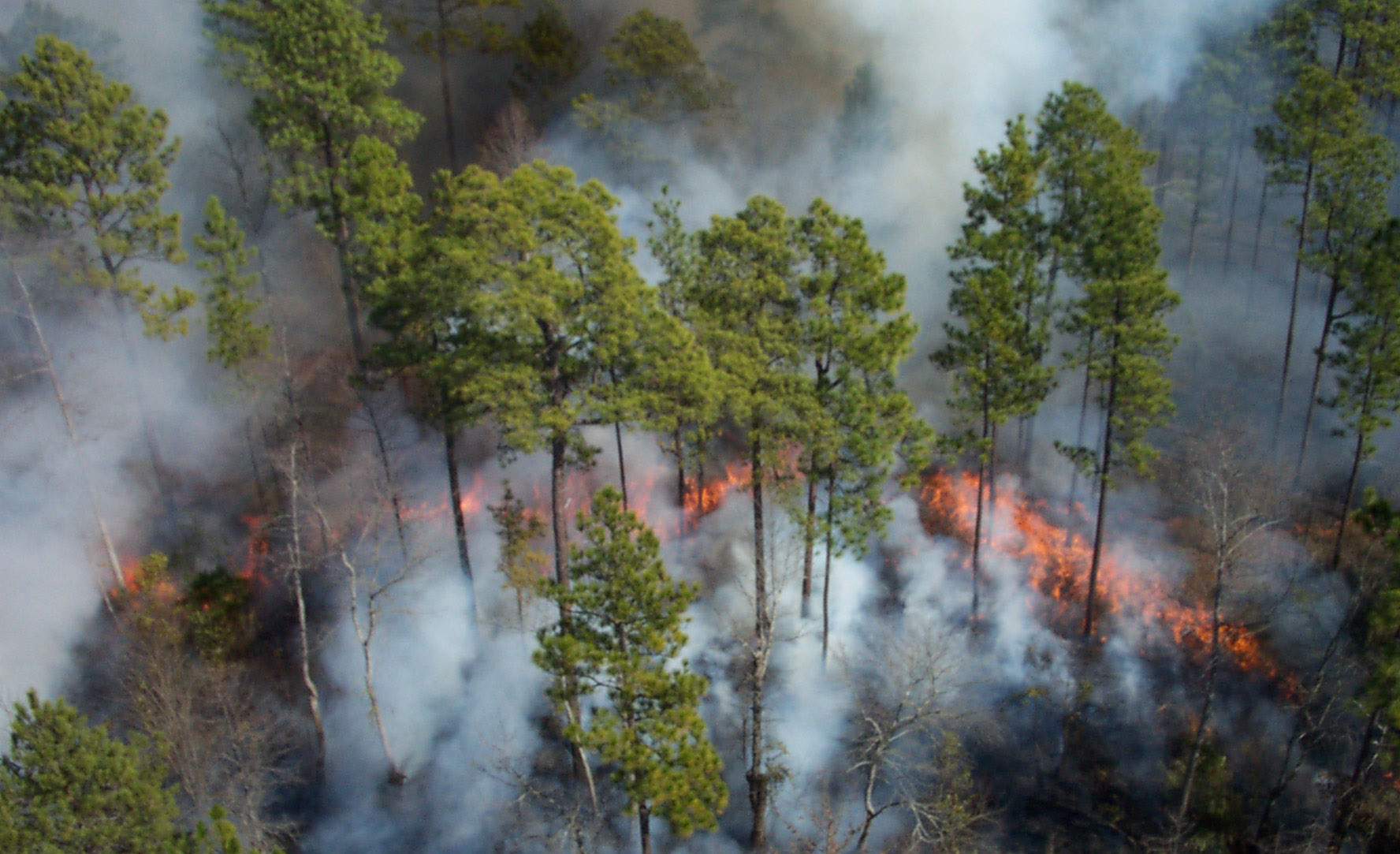
A controlled burn at the Okefenokee National Wildlife Refuge in southern Georgia.

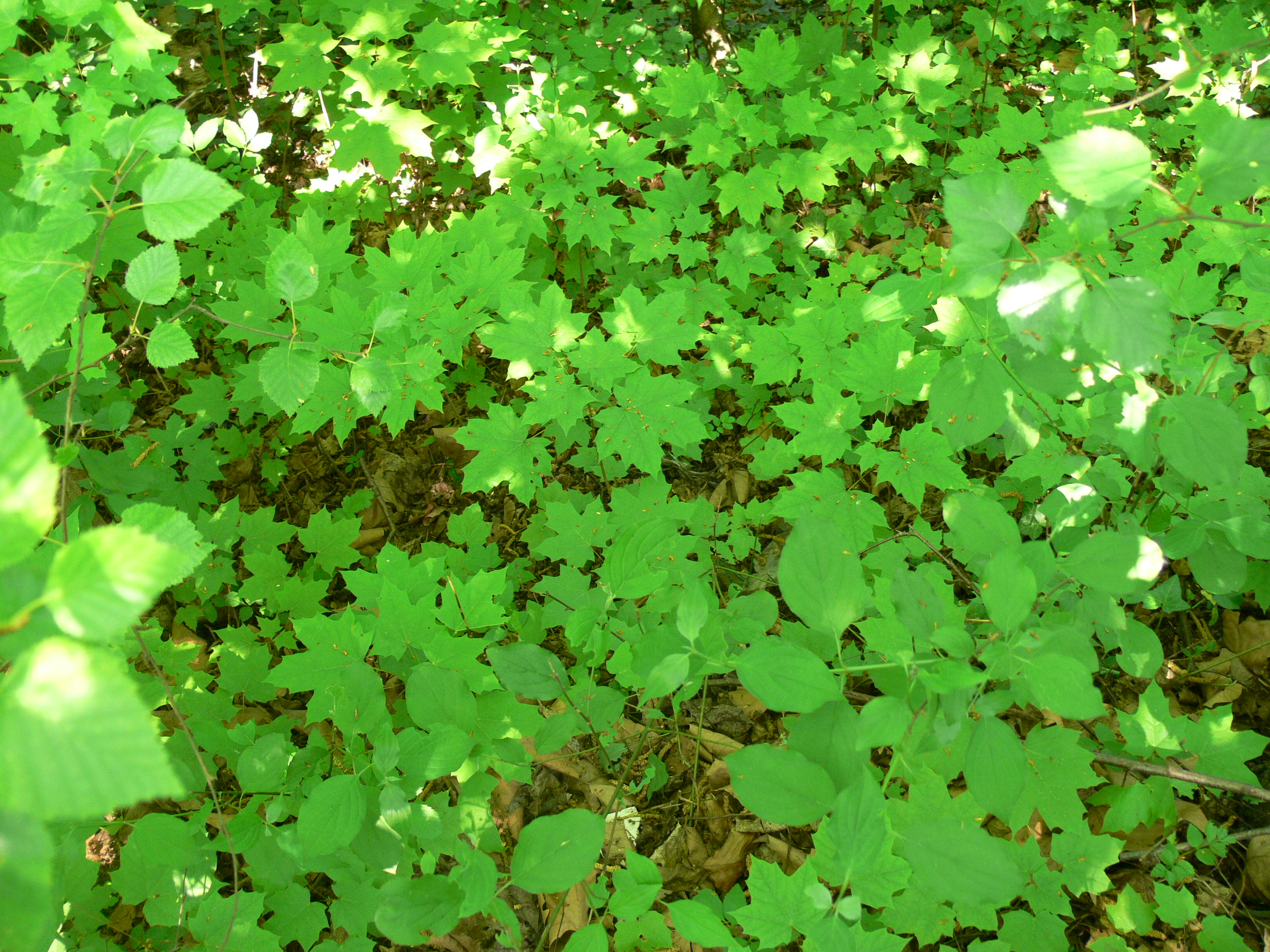
Natural regeneration of Acer platanoides in northern France, surrounded by woody and herbaceous competition.

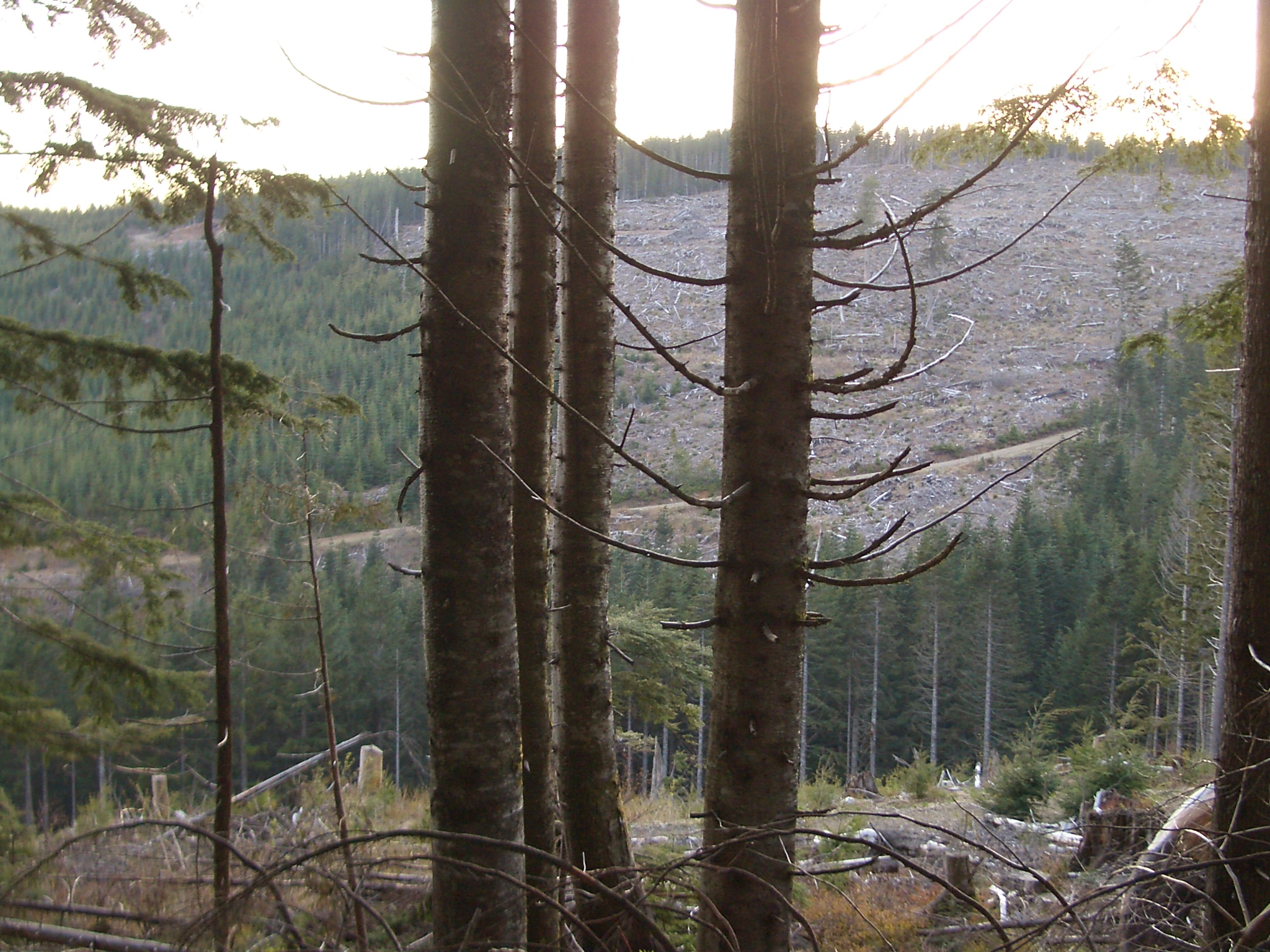
Clearcuts in the foreground and background at Rattlesnake Mountain, Montana.

Silviculture – practice of controlling the establishment, growth, composition, health, and quality of forests to meet diverse needs and values. Silviculture also focuses on making sure that the treatment(s) of forest stands are used to preserve and to better their productivity.

Site preparation

- Controlled burn – use of fire in order to eliminate weeds, brush, or slash, or to release on-site seeds of fire-dependent species
- Stump harvesting – removal of tree stumps either for biomass or to free up space in the soil
- Drum chopping – knocking down small trees and brush to clear the ground for planting

Planting

- Broadcast seeding – scattering of seed either by hand or mechanically over a relatively large area
- Aerial seeding – dispersing of seed from an aircraft, used especially in mountainous areas
- Treeplanting – transplanting of juvenile seedlings into the ground at a predetermined spacing

Intermediate treatments

- Weeding – removal or reduction of herbaceous or woody species around seedlings
- Cleaning – removal of competing saplings of similar age in order to favor saplings of desirable growth characteristics
- Liberation cutting – removal of older and established overtopping trees from desirable saplings
- Thinning – removal of trees to favor the growth of select trees in order to maximize timber production
- Ecological thinning – removal of trees to favor the growth of select trees in order to favor the development of wildlife habitat
- Pruning – removal of the lateral branches on the trees in order to improve wood quality
- Pollarding – annual removal of lateral branches or main stem in order to encourage growth of branches to provide for firewood, or fruit production

Harvest rotations

- Even-aged timber management

- Clearcutting – harvesting of all stems in a given area regardless of species and size
- Coppicing – cutting vigorous juvenile trees near the ground, regeneration comes from new shoots coming up from the stump
- Seed-tree – cutting of all trees save widely spaced residual trees, which will provide natural seedstock for the following generation and are later cut

- Uneven-aged timber management

- Selection – harvesting of selected trees in a stand, removing either merchantable timber or to favor the growth of desirable individuals (a thinning)
- Shelterwood – removal of merchantable trees in succession, establishing a multiaged stand
- Variable retention – removal of trees of varying density across a landscape, in order to retain structural diversity

- Other

- Salvage logging – harvesting of trees killed by natural disturbances in order to maximize economic returns that would otherwise be lost
- Sanitation harvest – removal of individual trees affected by a pathogen in order to diminish the possibility the entire stand being affected
- Biomass harvest – harvesting of small wood for energy purposes, either following a commercial harvest or for its own sake, such as in energy forestry
- Underwater logging – harvesting of trees from underwater forests flooded during construction of artificial dams or reservoirs

== Environmental issues pertaining to forests ==
- Afforestation – the process of establishing a forest on previously unforested land, for reasons of timber harvesting, conservation of biodiversity, or soil decontamination, among many
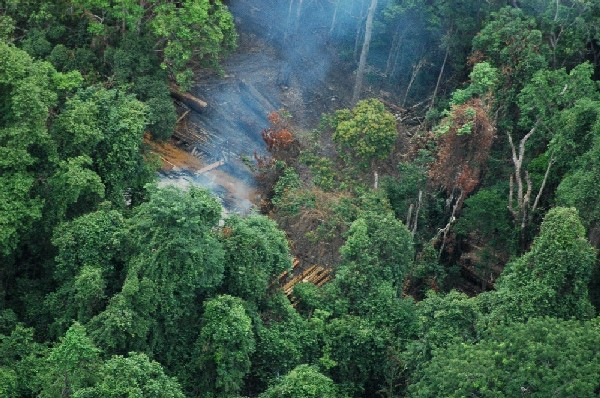
  Illegal logging in Cambodia.
- Biodiversity conservation – examines forests broader role in supporting a variety of (socio)ecological systems
- Carbon sequestration – focus on forests' broader ecological functioning in consumption of carbon dioxide
- Conservation – focus on sustainability of forest resources and preservation of forest-based biodiversity
- Deforestation – the removal of trees in a forested area without sufficient regeneration, resulting in desertification in arid areas and loss of habitat and biodiversity
  - Deforestation by region
- Ecological restoration – the role of trees in restoring degraded natural and built environments
- Flood control – addresses forests ecological role in natural regulation of rainfall
- Forest dieback – where trees on the periphery of a stand are killed by acid rain or parasites
- Forest fragmentation – occurring when forests are cut down in a manner that leaves relatively small, isolated patches of forest, resulting in high amounts of edges and subsequent loss in wildlife habitat and biodiversity
- Forest transition – shift from a period of net forest area loss (deforestation) to a period of net forest area gain (afforestation) for a given region or country
- High grading – type of selective logging that removes the highest timber quality trees, resulting in poor genetic stock for subsequent generations
- Illegal logging – the unlawful harvest, transportation, purchase or sale of timber, contributing to deforestation, corruption, and destabilization of international markets

== Forest resource assessment ==
Forest inventory – systematic collection of data and forest information for assessment or analysis. An estimate of the value and possible uses of timber is an important part of the broader information required to sustain ecosystems.

=== Timber metrics ===
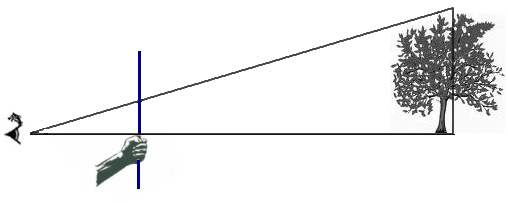
Figure demonstrating the ocular trigonometric principles behind the Biltmore stick.

- Diameter at breast height (DBH) – measurement of a tree's diameter standardized at 1.3 meters (about 4.5 feet) above the ground
- Basal area – defines the area of a given section of land that is occupied by the cross-section of tree trunks and stems at their base
- Tree taper – the degree to which a tree's stem or bole decreases in diameter as a function of height above ground
- Girard form class – an expression of tree taper calculated as the ratio of diameter inside the bark at 16 feet above ground to that outside the bark at DBH, primary expression of tree form used in the United States
- Quadratic mean diameter – diameter of the tree that coordinates to the stand's basal area
- Leaf Area Index – the ratio of total upper leaf surface of the forest canopy divided by the surface area of the land on which the vegetation grows
- Tools

- Biltmore stick – utilizes ocular trigonometry to quickly measure diameter and height
- Diameter tape – cloth or metal tape that is wrapped around the bole, scaled to diameter
- Caliper – two prongs connected to a measuring tape are placed around the most average part of the bole to determine diameter
- Relascope – multiple-use tool that is able to find tree height, basal area, and tree diameter anywhere along the bole
- Clinometer – common tool used to measure changes in elevation and tree height
- Cruising rod – similar to a caliper, calculates the number of pieces of lumber yielded by a given piece of timber by measuring its diameter
- Hemispherical photography – estimates solar radiation and characterize plant canopy structure/density using photographs taken looking upward through an extreme wide-angle lens

=== Surveying techniques ===
- Traversing – method of surveying used to establish sampling plots along a line or path of travel
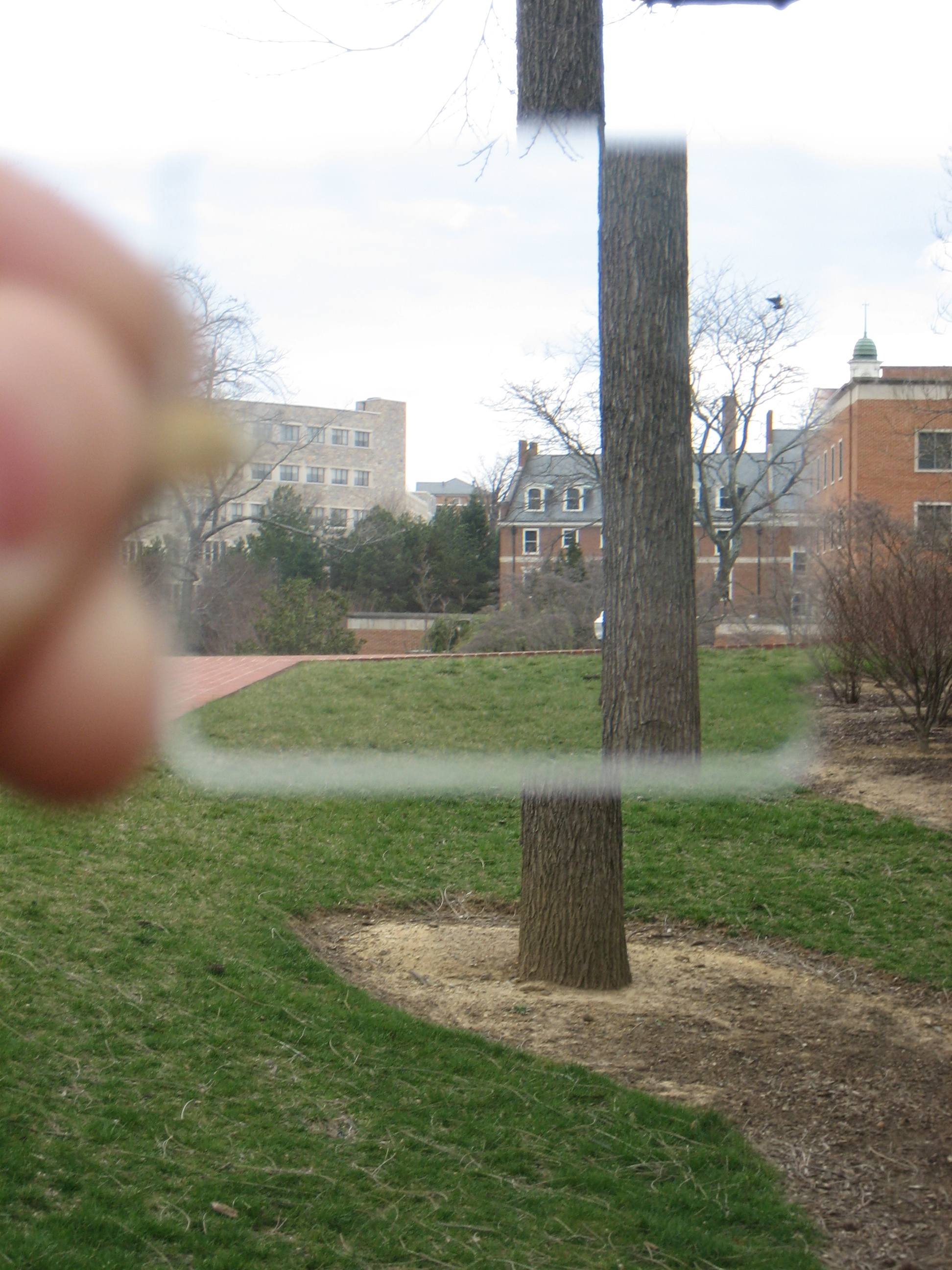
  A wedge prism showing a borderline tree.
- Chain – equivalent to 66 feet, widely used distance in surveying practices in the United States and other countries influenced by imperial Great Britain
- Line plot survey – plots taken at a regular predetermined distance along the traverse path
- Tools

- Pacing – quick method used to survey in the field, requiring calibration of one's "paces" (pair of footsteps) to a known distance (often a chain)
- Hand compass – a compact magnetic compass with a sighting device used to determine the location of plots for a given bearing
- Wedge prism – optical instrument typically made of glass ground at slight angles to refract light passing through it from the smaller width side of the prism to the thicker width side of the prism, calibrated to a desired plot size (basal area factor)
- Angle gauge – similar in principle to a wedge prism, although it must be held a fixed distance from the eye
- GPS – global satellite navigation systems used to determine the position of oneself and plots
- GIS – an information system capable of integrating, storing, analyzing, and displaying forest geographic information collected in the field

=== Timber volume determination ===
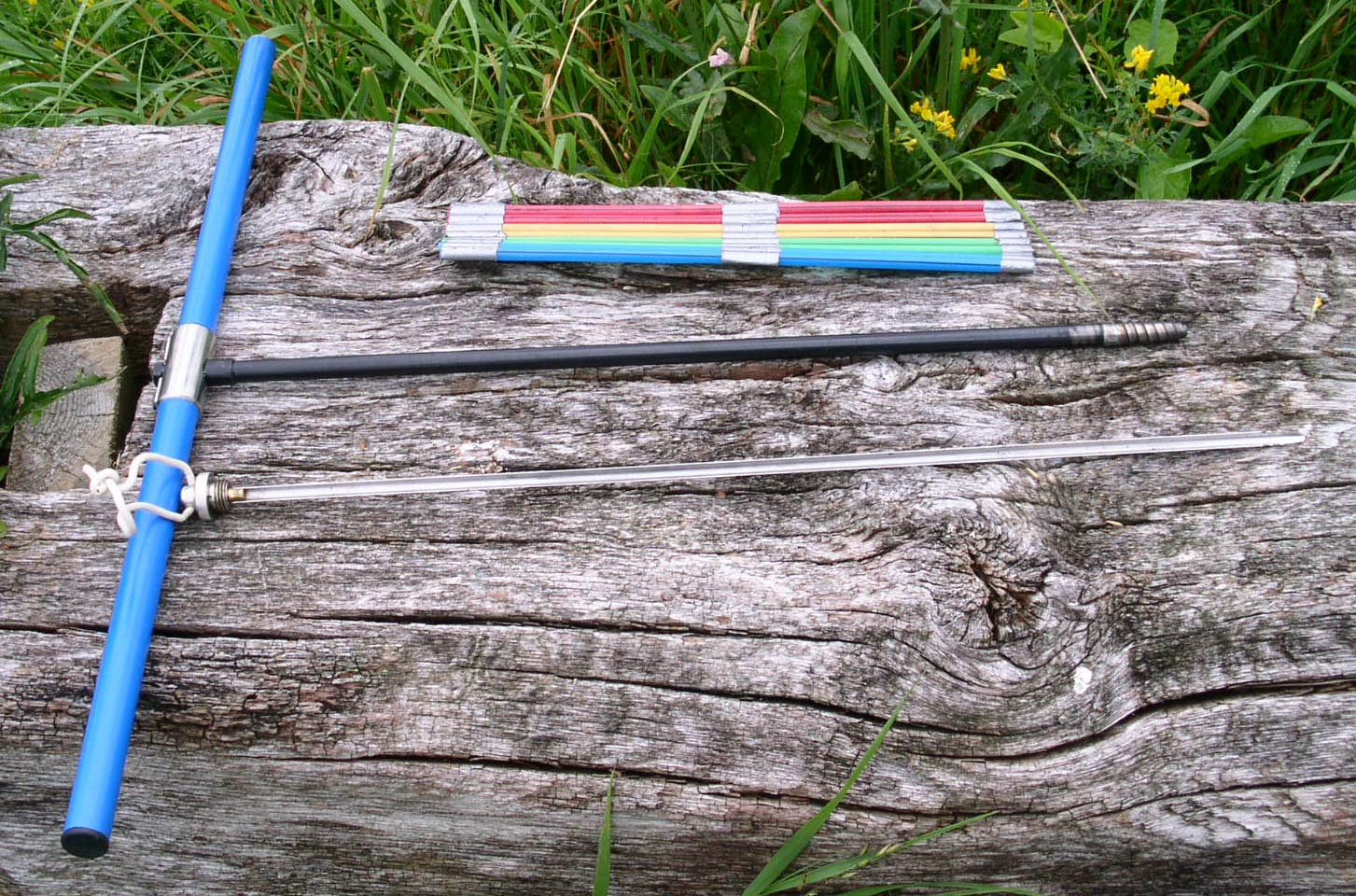
An increment borer with common drinking straws, a cost-effective manner often used to hold derived cores.

- Site index – a species specific measure of site productivity and management options, reported as the height of dominant and co-dominant trees (site trees)in a stand at a base age such as 25, 50 and 100 years
- Stocking – a quantitative measure of the area occupied by trees relative to an optimum or desired level of density which varies according to management purpose even on the same site

- Stand Density Index – a measure of the stocking of a stand of trees based on the number of trees per unit area and DBH of the tree of average basal area

- Volume table – a chart based on volume equations that uses correlations between certain aspects of a tree to estimate the standing volume
- Stand density management diagram – model that uses current stand density to project future stand composition
- Units of measurement

- Cord – very common measure, equivalent to 128 cubic feet (3.6 m^{3}), corresponding to a pile of wood, bark, and air 4 feet wide by 4 feet high and 8 feet long
- Stère – invented in France, equivalent to a cubic meter of cut wood with space for air
- Board foot – specialized unit of measure for lumber in North America, equivalent to the volume of a one foot length of a board one foot wide and one inch thick

=== Stand growth assessment ===
- Increment borer – specialized tool used to extract a section of wood tissue from a living tree with relatively minor injury to the tree, used often for tree growth analysis
- Mean annual increment (MAI) – refers to the average growth per year a tree or stand of trees has exhibited at a specific age
- Periodic annual increment (PAI) – describes the average annual change in tree diameter between the beginning and ending of a growth period, used more often than MAI for percental growth
- Ecological yield -the amount of wood volume in any given year whose harvesting would be considered sustainable
- Growth and yield modelling – entails the creation of models of prospective tree growth and harvest yield for management purposes

- Economics

- Stumpage – the price charged by a land owner to loggers for the right to harvest standing timber on that land
- Optimal rotation age – the age at which the harvesting of stumpage will generate the maximum revenue or economic yield

== Harvesting ==
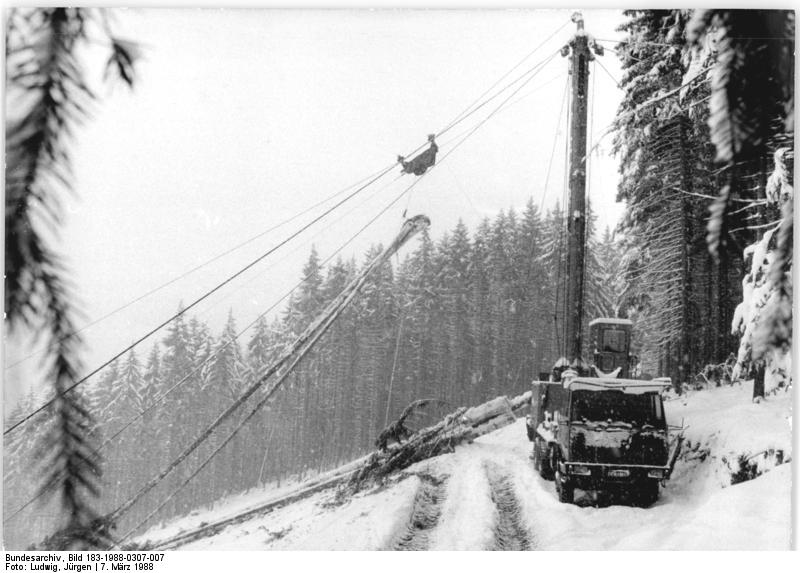
A cable logging setup in Germany (1988).

Logging – cutting, skidding, on-site processing, and loading of trees or logs onto trucks or skeleton cars. The term is sometimes used in a narrow sense to mean moving wood from the stump to somewhere outside the forest, usually a sawmill or a lumber yard. However, in common usage, the term may be used to indicate a range of forestry or silviculture activities...

=== Harvesting methods ===
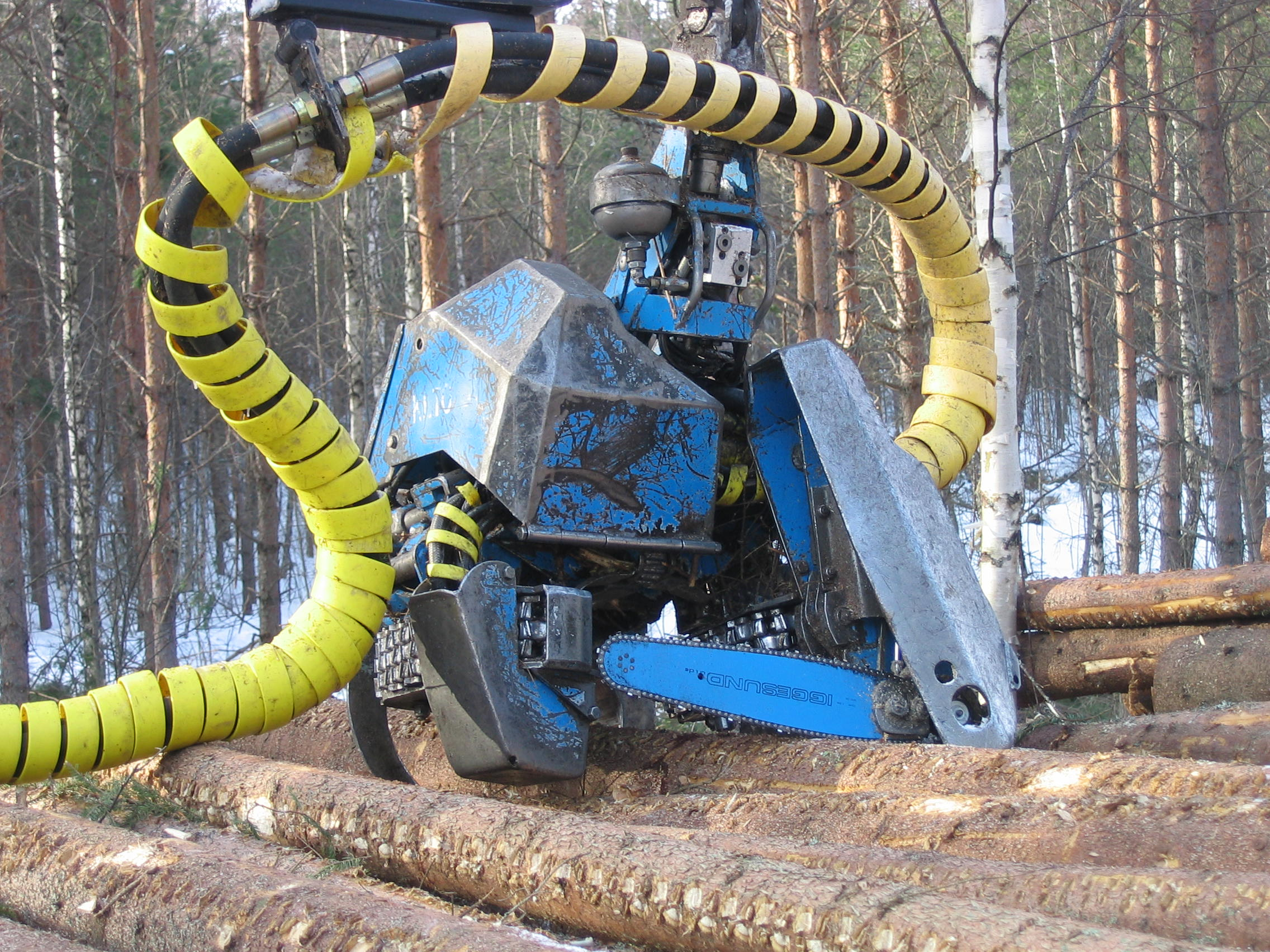
The boom of a cut-to-length harvester with attached chainsaw cutting Pinus sylvestris in Finland.

- Felling – process of cutting down a tree
- Bucking – splitting of a felled and delimbed trees into logs
- Scaling – measurement of felled trees to determine the volume of merchantable wood
- Skidding – transportation of logs from the site of felling to the landing along the ground
- Forwarding – transportation of logs from the site of felling to the landing above the ground, usually to minimize soil disturbance but limits the size or amount of logs that can be moved at once
- Hauling – long-distance transportation of logs from the landing to their final destination, usually with a semi-truck but occasionally with a train
- Woodchipping – grinding of logs into chips for engineered wood, mulch, paper, or fuel
- Cut-to-length logging (CTL) – an expensive but efficient system where trees are felled, delimbed, and bucked to scale directly at the felling site
- Cable logging – skidding using a wire cable attached to the felled trees, most common in areas with steep topographic relief, variations include

- High lead logging – a cable is anchored to a tree at the top of the hill:
- Skyline logging – a carriage is used alongside the main cable to provide leverage

- Shovel logging – transport of multiple logs close to the logging road using a stationary loader, often used to minimize soil disturbance
- Heli-logging – transport of logs from the forest to the landing via helicopter, most commonly used in inaccessible areas or to minimize impact on the soil
- Log driving – transportation of individual logs on a waterway to a mill or port downstream
- Timber rafting – transportation downstream of multiple logs bundled together into a raft, considered less dangerous than log driving

=== Harvesting tools ===
==== Timber felling tools ====
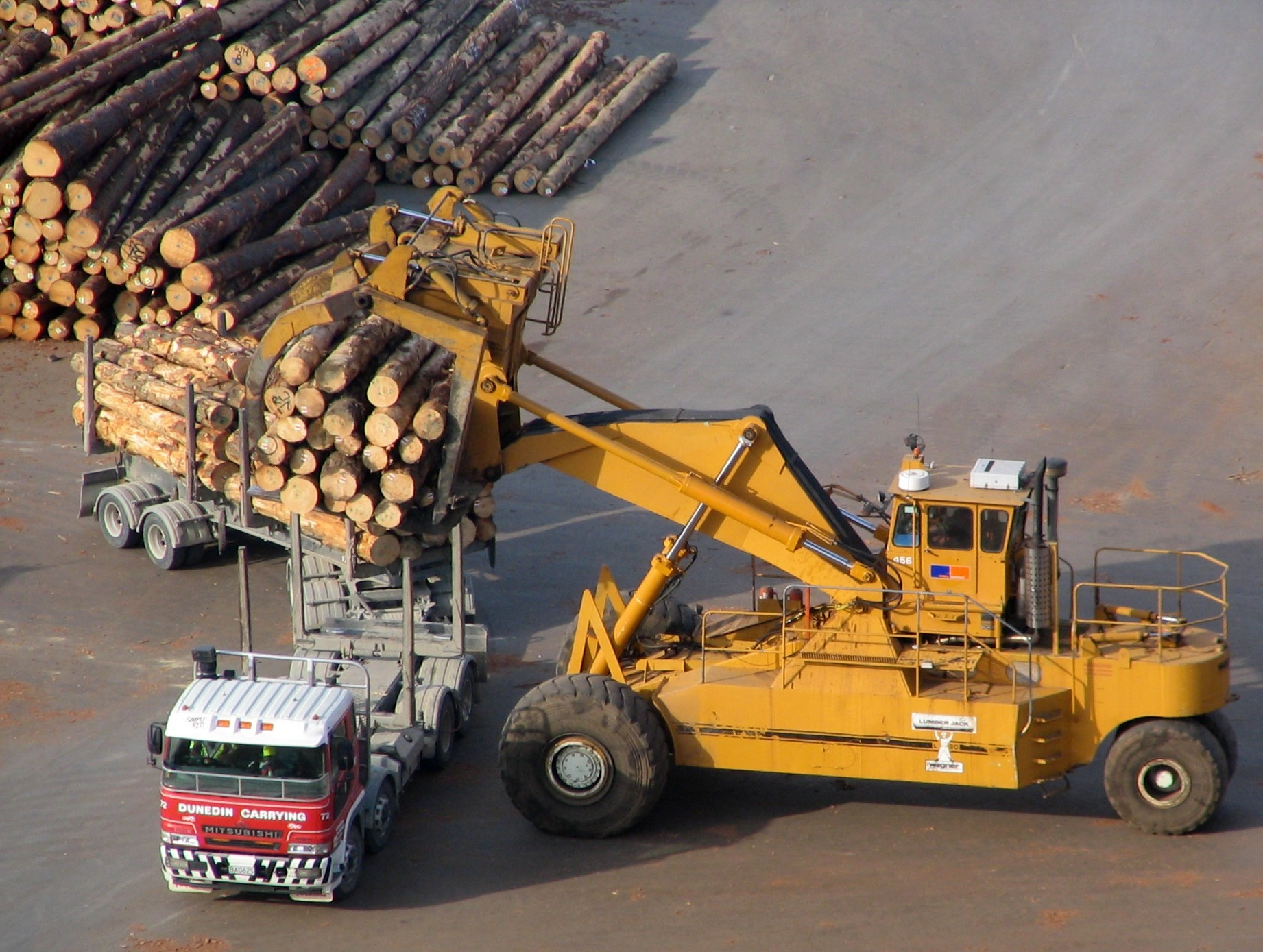
A loader lifting logs off a semi at Port Chalmers, within the city of Dunedin, New Zealand.

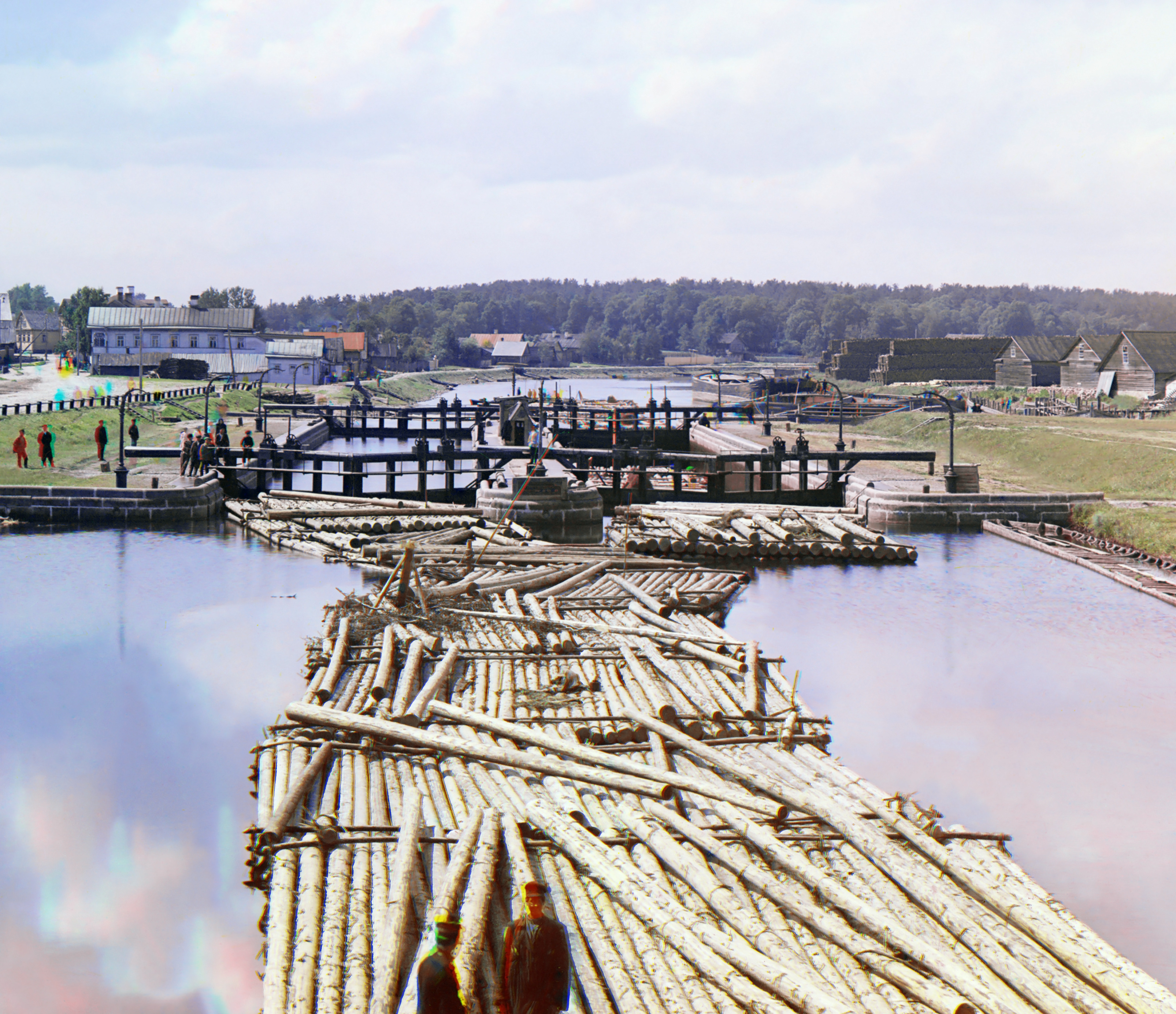
Timber rafts being floated into the city of Shlisselburg, in northwestern Russia (1909).

- Hand

- Axe – primitive tool used felling and splitting
- Chainsaw – portable mechanized all-purpose saw, the most common tool used in hand-felling
- Crosscut saw – saws that have teeth that are designed to cut wood at a right angle to the direction of the wood grain, used for felling and bucking
- Bucksaw – a type of crosscut saw used by one or two people to buck felled trees into sawlogs

- Mechanized

- Feller buncher – vehicle with an attachment that can rapidly cut and gather several smaller trees before felling them
- Harvester – first half of the CTL system, vehicle that cuts, delimbs, and bucks the logs "to length"

==== Log transportation tools ====
- Ground

- Peavey – a traditional tool consisting of a wooden lever handle with a movable metal hook with a sharp tip, used to spear the log for handling and moving
- Cant Hook – tool with the same premise as the peavey but with blunt teeth-bearing tip
- Yarder – in cable logging, a piece of equipment utilizing a pulley system of cables to pull or fly logs from the stump to the landing
- Forwarder – second half of the CTL system, the vehicle that carries logs clear off the ground from the felling site to the roadside landing
- Skidder – vehicle that drags logs along the ground from the felling site to the roadside landing

- Michigan logging wheels – historical skidder, consisting of a specially designed large set of wooden wagon wheels and could be used in unfrozen soil conditions
- Skid cone – a steel or plastic cone placed on the end of a log while being skidded, in order to ease its transportation or protect residual trees

- Water

- Splash dam – a dam built to temporarily raise the water level of a river to float timber downstream
- Flume – chutes specifically constructed to transport lumber and logs down mountainous terrain to a sawmill by using flowing water.

- Timber slide – chutes constructed parallel to a river in order to avoid damage to timber rafts caused by rapids or waterfalls

- Boom – barriers placed in a river, designed to collect and or contain floating logs felled from nearby forests

== Forest products ==
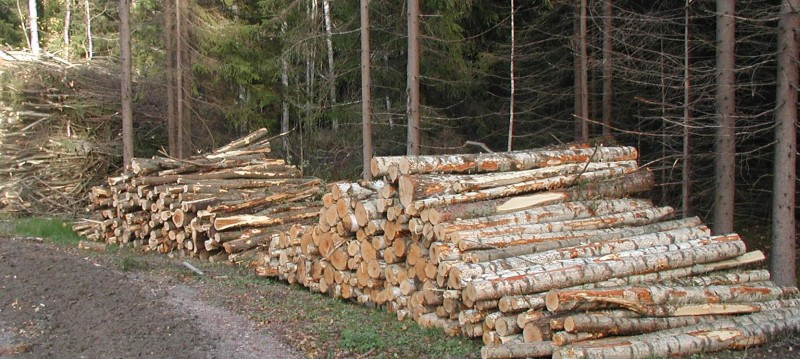
A harvest landing with slash/biomass on the left, followed by pulpwood and sawlogs in Espoo, Finland.

Forest product – any material derived from a forest for direct consumption or commercial use, such as lumber, paper, or forage for livestock. Wood is by far the dominant forest product, used for fuel (as firewood or charcoal), structural materials in the construction of buildings, or as a raw material, such as wood pulp used in the production of paper. All non-wood products derived from forest resources are called non-timber forest products.

=== Primary forest products ===
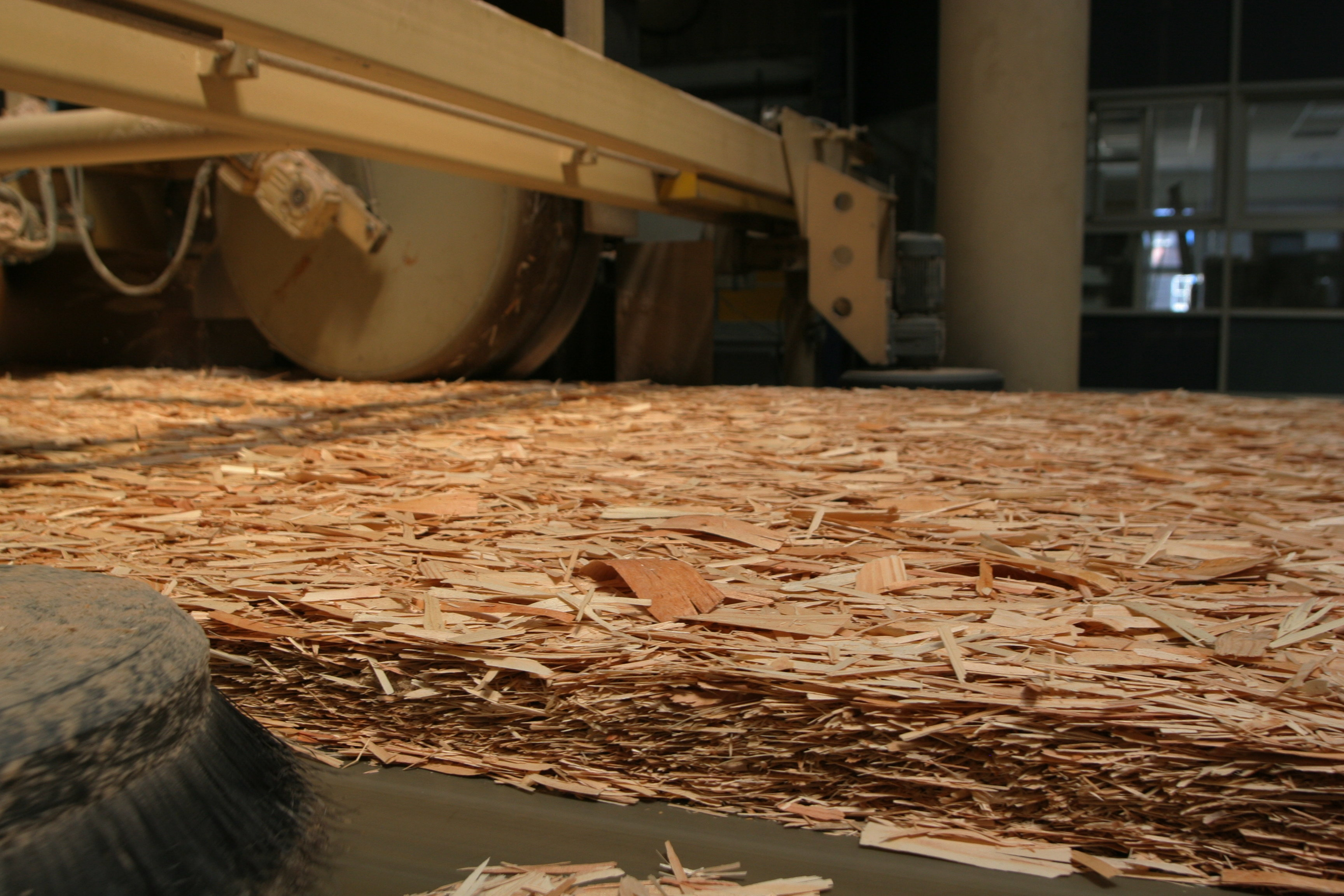
Production of oriented strand board.

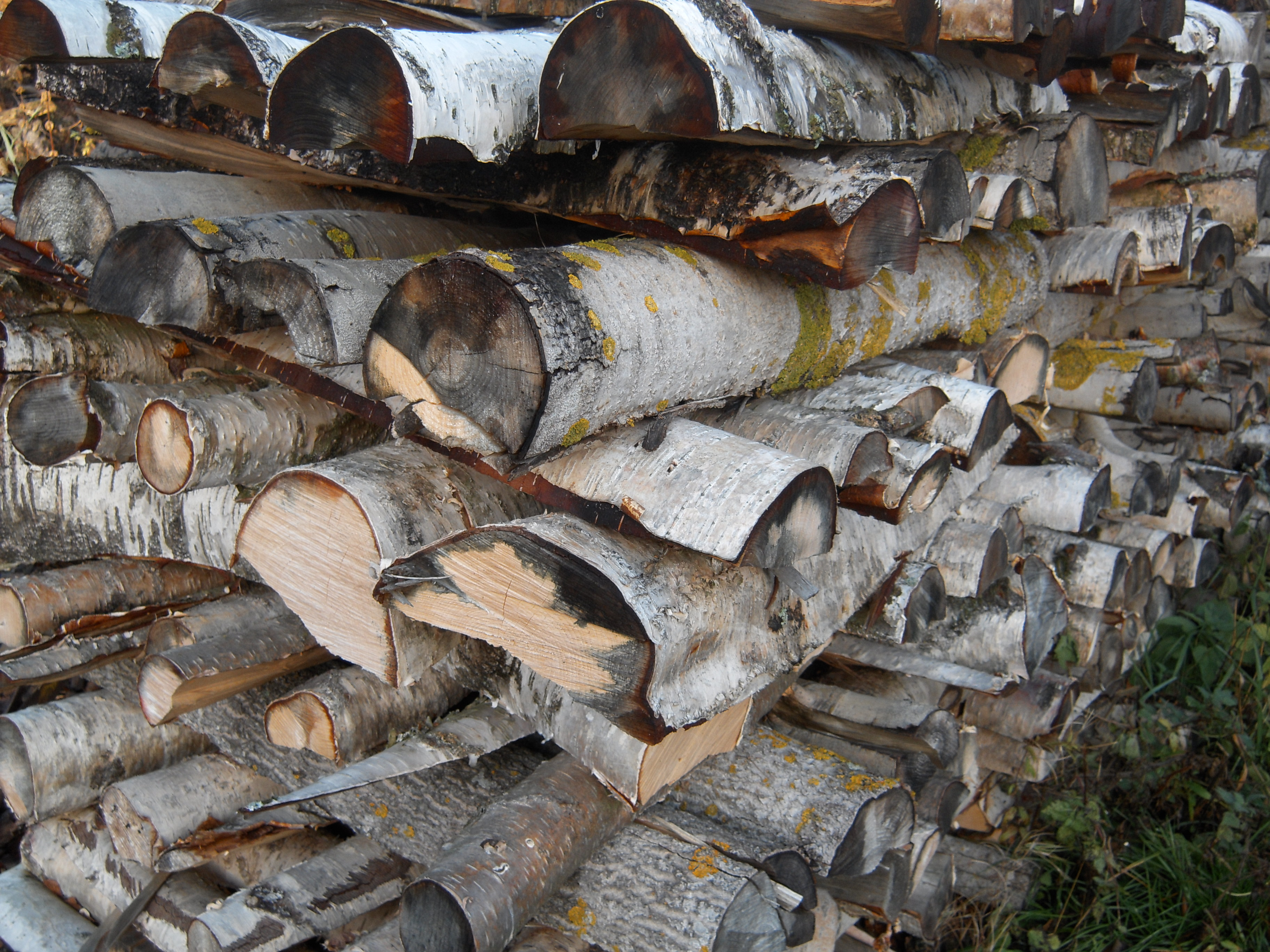
A stack of Betula pubescens firewood in Central Ostrobothnia, Finland.

- Lumber (also "timber") – structural material for the construction of buildings or furniture making
- Paper – made from wood pulp derived from the timber stock pulpwood
- Paperboard – a thick packaging material derived from paper, cardboard is the generic term
- Veneer – thin layers of high-quality wood, often decorative but also the primary product in plywood
- Multilaminar veneer – like veneer, but utilizes plantation wood in accordance with the principles of sustainable forest management
- Oriented strand board – mainly used in structural insulated panels, has largely replaced plywood
- Fiberboard – a cheaper and denser form of plywood, used when cost is considered most important. Often used as the underlying structure in car dashboards
- Drywall – a gypsum plaster placed inside two sheets of paper, used commonly as the finishing step in construction of interior walls and ceilings
- Wood-plastic composite – made from recycled materials, is crack- and split-resistant and used commonly outdoors

=== Secondary forest products ===
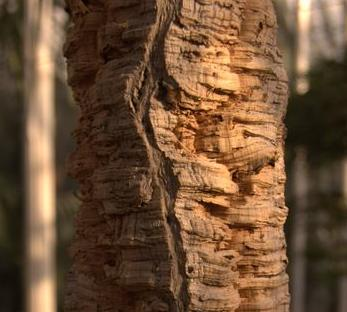
The distinctive bark of Quercus suber, from which natural cork is derived.

- Fuel
  - Firewood – the most unprocessed form of wood fuel, supplies the majority of the developing world's energy needs
  - Pellets – a byproduct from sawmilling, is formed from compacted sawdust, easy to transport and has a high combustion efficiency
  - Cellulosic ethanol and Biomethanol – second generation biofuels that are a potential replacement for gasoline
  - Charcoal – derived from tar, is used extensively in cooking, industry, and water purification, among others
  - Black liquor – a byproduct from pulp production, can be gasified and used as a syngas
- Byproducts
  - Cork – used to stop wine bottles and as the core in baseballs
  - Tar – mainly used as a sealant for shingles and watercraft hulls
  - Turpentine – derived from tar, historically used extensively to thin oil-based paints and a protective furniture wax
  - Rubber – wide range of commercial and industrial uses, tires and tubes are the largest consumer uses
  - Creosote – historically been used as a disinfectant, laxative, and to treat coughs
  - Tall oil – a cheap alternative for use in soaps, lubricants, and drilling fluid
- Ecosystem services
  - Carbon sequestration – a technique for long-term storage of carbon to combat global warming
  - Water purification – riparian forests act as biofilters to capture and biologically degrade pollutants
  - Outdoor recreation – provides the natural infrastructure needed for ecotourism
  - Land rehabilitation – the restoration of degraded land to its former state, largely accomplished through phytoremediation

== Forestry by region ==
=== Forestry in Africa ===
- Central African Republic
- Chad
- Ethiopia
- Ghana
- Sudan
- Uganda

=== Forestry in the Americas ===
- Argentina
- Canada
- Chile
- Mexico
- United States

=== Forestry in Asia ===
- Bangladesh
- Bhutan
- Cambodia
- India
- Japan
- Nepal
- Pakistan
- Sri Lanka
- Syria
- Taiwan

=== Forestry in Europe ===
- Estonia
- Finland
- Germany
- Poland
- Russia
- Romania
- Spain
- Sweden
- Turkey
- United Kingdom
  - Scotland
  - Wales

=== Forestry in Oceania ===
- Australia
  - Tasmania
- New Zealand

== History of forestry ==
=== History of forestry, by period ===
==== Ancient forestry ====
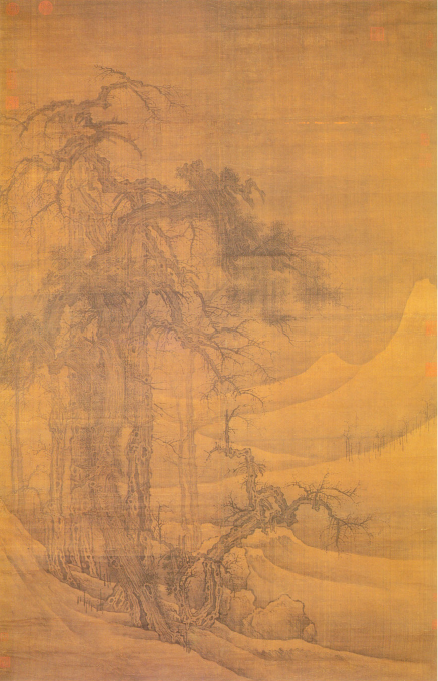
"Winter forest," painting by Kwok Hei (郭熙), Song Dynasty, China

- Primitive forest management

- Shifting cultivation

- Shifting cultivation under stress

- History of forestry in China

- Forestry in the Zhou dynasty (Chow) (1045–256 BCE)
- Forestry in the Qin dynasty (Chin) (221–206 BCE)
- Forestry in the Han dynasty (206 BCE – 220 A.D.)
- Forestry in the Three Kingdoms (220–280 A.D.)
- Forestry in the Jin dynasty (266–420 A.D.)
- Forestry in the Southern and Northern dynasties (Sung) (420–589 A.D.)
- Forestry in the Sui dynasty (581–618 A.D.)
- Forestry in the Tang dynasty (618–907 A.D.)
- Forestry in the Liao dynasty (907–1125 A.D.)
- Forestry in the Song dynasty (960–1279 A.D.)
- Forestry in the Yuan dynasty (1271–1368 A.D.)
- Forestry in the Ming dynasty (1368–1644 A.D.)
- Forestry in the Qing dynasty (Ch'ing) (1644–1911)
- Forestry in the Republic of China (1912–1949)

==== Early modern forestry ====
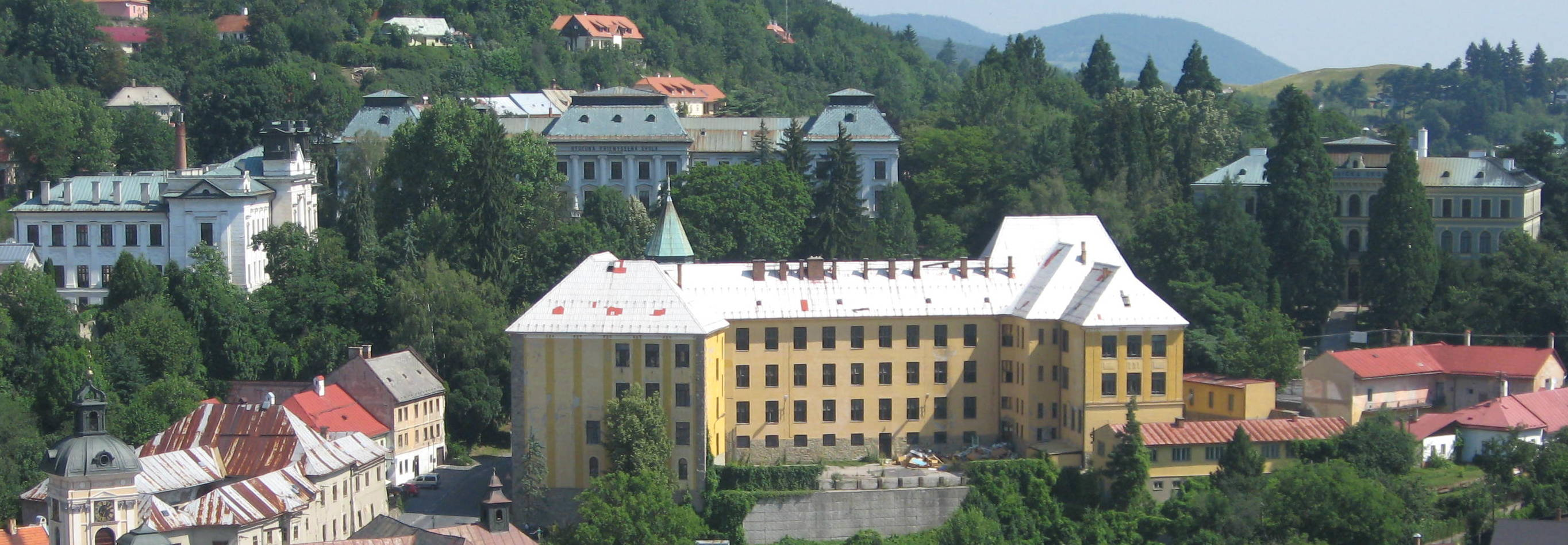
Former Academy of Mining and Forestry, Banská Štiavnica, Slovakia

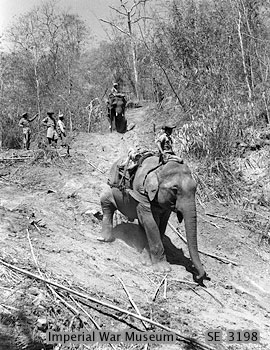
Elephant logging in Burma, 1945

- Pre-mechanical forestry

- Horse-drawn logging

- History of forestry in Europe

- History of forestry in Austria-Hungary
- History of forestry in France
- History of forestry in Germany
- History of forestry in Russia
- History of forestry in Sweden

- Naval forestry

- Naval stores industry

- Colonial forestry

- British timber trade
- History of American mahogany trade
- History of forestry in Burma
- History of forestry in India
- History of forestry on Java
- History of forestry in Mexico
- History of forestry in Trinidad and Tobago

==== Modern forestry ====
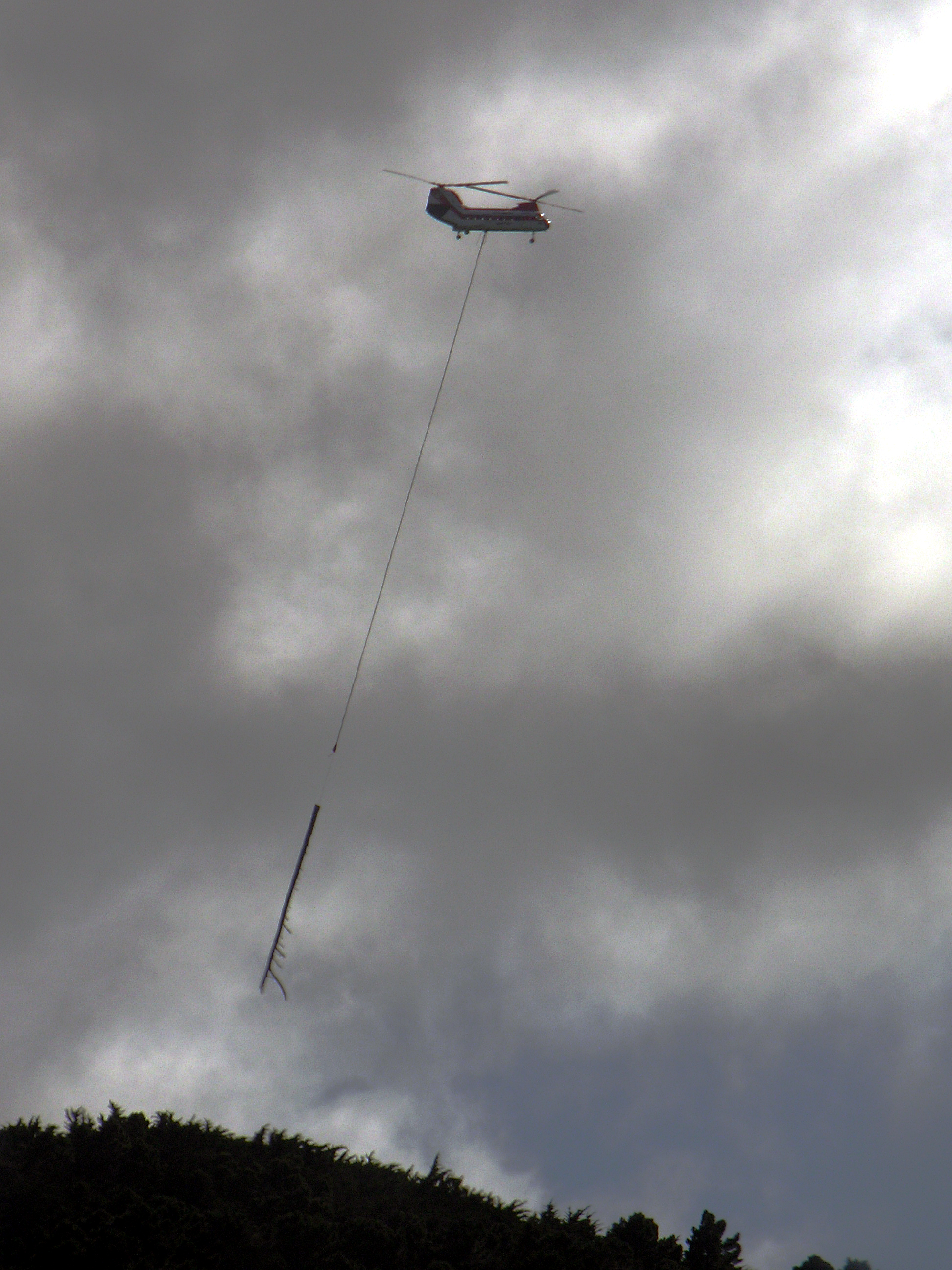
Heli-logging near Wellington, NZ, 2005

- Forestry during World War I
- Forestry in the Alps
- Forestry in Brazil
  - Deforestation in Brazil
    - As a major environmental issue
  - Forest governance in Brazil
  - Selective logging in the Amazon rainforest
- Forestry in Chile
- Forestry in China
- Mechanized forestry
- Scientific forestry

- Selective forestry
- Controlled burn
- Heli-logging
- Reafforestation
- Plantation forestry

- Boreal forestry
- Tropical forestry

==== Contemporary forestry ====
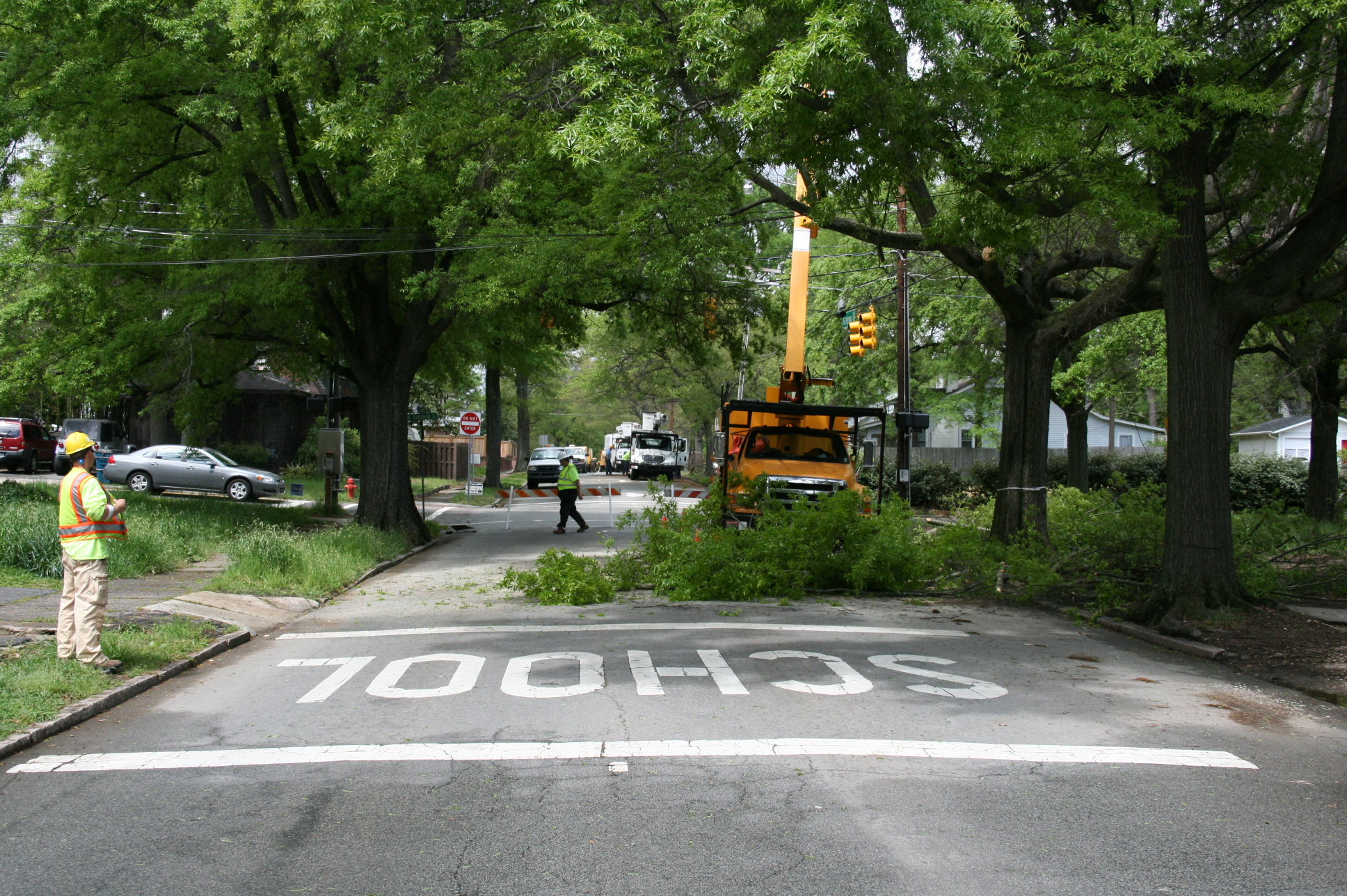
Urban forestry, Durham, North Carolina, 2008

- Urban forestry
- Plant a million trees
- Environmental forestry

- Forest aesthetics

- Forest restoration

- Analog forestry

- Ecological forestry

=== History of forestry institutions ===
==== History of forestry law ====
- History of forestry law

United States

- Forest Reserve Act of 1891
- Multiple Use – Sustained Yield Act of 1960 required multiple use of federal forest land
- Organic Act of 1897
- Right of Way Act of 1901 – an act relating to rights of way through certain parks, reservations, and other public lands (H.R. 11973)
- Transfer Act of 1905 – an act providing for the transfer of forest reserves from the Department of Interior to the Department of Agriculture (H.R. 8460, Public Resolution No. 34)
- American Antiquities Act of 1906
- Appropriations Act Forbidding Further National Forests ("An Act Making appropriations for the Department of Agriculture for the fiscal year ending June thirtieth, nineteen hundred and eight", 1907) – also forbidding renaming forest reserves to National Forests (H.R. 24815, Public Act No. 242:2)

Hong Kong

- Forests and Countryside Ordinance (1997)

India

- Indian Forest Act, 1927
- Forest Rights Act (India) – a historic law passed in 2006 protecting the rights of scheduled tribes and other forest dwellers

International

- International Tropical Timber Agreement, 1983
- International Tropical Timber Agreement, 1994

- Forest rights

- Right of Way Act of 1901, USA, relating to rights of way through certain parks, reservations, and other public lands. H.R. 11973
- Forest Rights Act (India)

==== History of forestry agencies ====
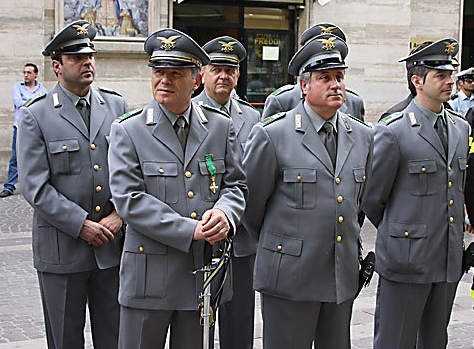
Corpo Forestale dello Stato, Italy

- History of forestry agencies

- Canadian Forest Service (Canada)
- Indian Forest Service (India)
- Corpo Forestale dello Stato (Italy)
- Ministry of Agriculture, Forestry and Fisheries (Japan)
- Korea Forest Service (S. Korea)
- CONAFOR Comisión Nacional Forestal (Mexico)
- New Zealand Forest Service (NZ)
- Department of Forest Conservation (Sri Lanka)
- Forestry Commission (United Kingdom)
- United States Forest Service, History of the United States Forest Service (USA)

==== History of forestry organizations ====
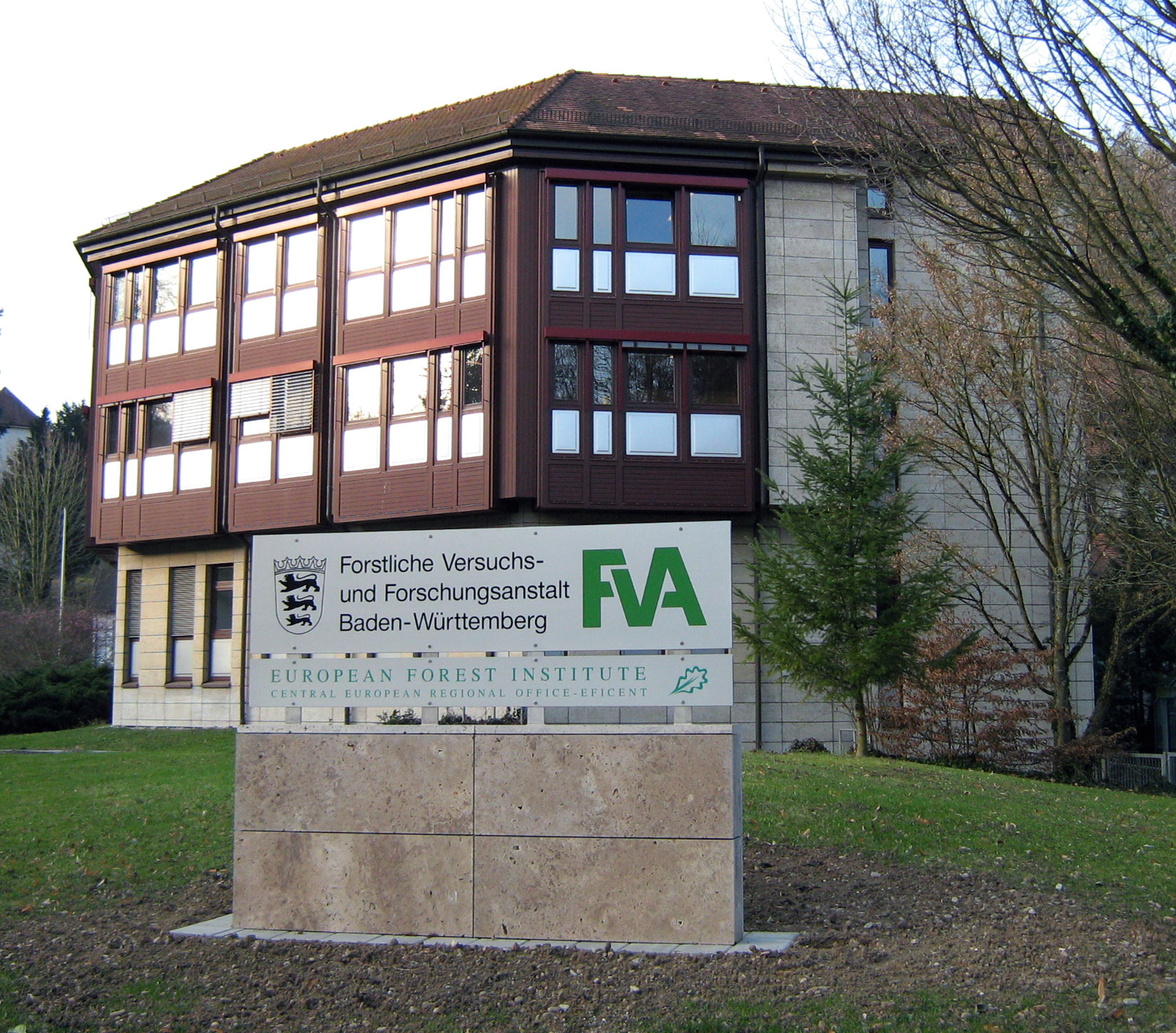
European Forest Institute, Central European Regional Office, Baden-Württemberg, Germany

History of forestry organizations

- History of the European Forest Institute
- History of the Food and Agriculture Organization
- History of the Forest History Society
- History of the Forest Stewardship Council
- History of the International Tropical Timber Organization
- History of the International Union of Forest Research Organizations
- History of the Royal Forestry Society of England, Wales, and Northern Ireland
- History of the Society of American Foresters

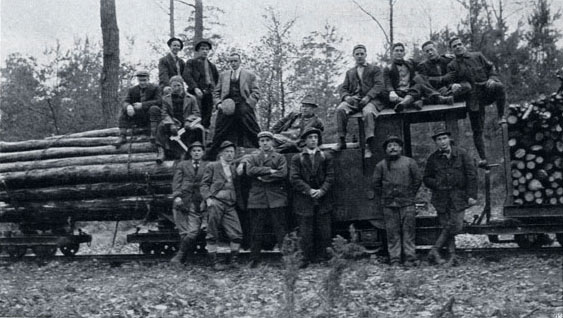
Students from the Biltmore Forest School (USA), inspecting a forest rail line in Germany, c. 1912

===== Historic schools of forestry =====
- Biltmore Forest School, near Asheville, North Carolina – the first school of forestry in North America
- French National School of Forestry, Nancy, est. 1824
- History of the Imperial Forestry Institute at Oxford
- History of the New York State College of Forestry – the first four-year college of forestry in North America
- History of the Pennsylvania Forestry Academy
- Imperial Forestry School, Dehadrun, India
- Mining and Forestry Academy, Schemnitz, Austria-Hungary
- Royal Saxon Academy of Forestry
- Saint Petersburg Forestry Institute

==== History of forestry as a profession ====
- History of forestry as a profession

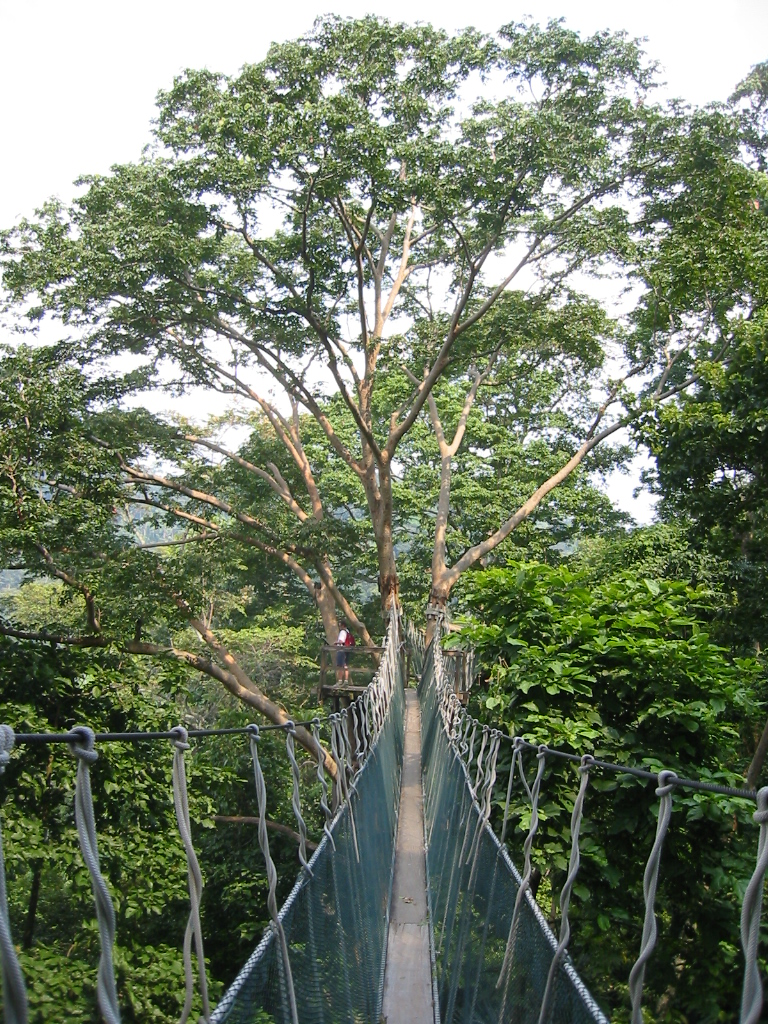
Forest Research Institute of Malaysia, canopy walk

==== History of forestry research ====
- History of forestry research

- Forest Research Institute Malaysia
- Forest Products Laboratory USA

==== History of forestry conferences ====
- History of forestry conferences

- First International Forestry Exhibition, Edinburgh, Scotland, 1884
- World Forestry Congress – the largest and most significant gathering of the world forestry sector, held since 1926 under the auspices of the FAO
- IUFRO World Congress

=== History of forestry science and technology ===
- History of silviculture
- History of forestry technology

- History of the chainsaw
- History of the crosscut saw
- History of the mechanization of forestry
- Use of remote sensing in forestry
- Use of computer modeling in forestry

== Forestry education ==
- Forest research institutes – formal forest (or forestry) research institutes around the world
- Forestry technical schools – specializing in technical or practical training in forestry
- Forestry universities and colleges – institutions worldwide providing graduate and/or undergraduate education leading to a degree in forestry
- Historic schools of forestry – schools of forestry throughout history

== Forestry organizations ==
- Confederation of Forest Industries

=== Governmental forestry agencies ===
- List of forestry ministries – government forestry agencies, by country

=== International forestry organizations ===
- ASEAN-ROK Forest Cooperation
- Avoided Deforestation Partners
- Center for International Forestry Research
- Coalition for Rainforest Nations
- Collaborative Partnership on Forests
- Commonwealth Forestry Association
- Community Forestry International
- Congo Basin Forest Partnership
- Conservation International
- European Arboricultural Council
- FERN
- Forest Peoples Programme
- Forest Stewardship Council
- The Forest Trust
- Forestry Information Centre
- Forests Monitor
- Foundation for Environmental Education
- Global Forest Coalition
- Global Forest Information Service
- Global Forest Information System
- International Analog Forestry Network
- International Association of Students in Agricultural and Related Sciences
- International Forestry Students' Association
- International Society of Arboriculture
- International Tropical Timber Organization
- International Union for Conservation of Nature
- International Union of Forest Research Organizations
- NICOL Forests UK
- Plant A Tree Today Foundation
- Programme for the Endorsement of Forest Certification
- Rainforest Action Network
- Rainforest Alliance
- Rainforest Foundation Fund
- RECOFTC – The Center for People and Forests
- Resource Extraction Monitoring
- Roundtable on Sustainable Palm Oil
- Sustainable Forestry Initiative
- Taiga Rescue Network
- Tropenbos International
- United Nations REDD Programme
- United Nations Forum on Forests
- World Rainforest Movement

== Forestry publications ==
- List of forestry journals – academic journals in forestry and related fields

== Notable people ==
- John Evelyn (1620–1706) – known for his knowledge of trees, and his treatise Sylva, or A Discourse of Forest-Trees and the Propagation of Timber (1664)
- Henrik Dávid Wilckens (1763–1832) – Austro-Hungarian founder of the Schemnitz Forestry Institute, 1809, later to become the Mining and Forestry Academy, in what today is Banská Štiavnica, Slovakia
- Heinrich Cotta (1763–1844) – German silviculturist and pioneer of modern scientific forestry, founder of the Royal Saxon Academy of Forestry
- Georg Ludwig Hartig (1764–1837) – prominent forest manager, author, and founder of one of the first dedicated schools of forestry in Europe; affiliated in his later years with the University of Berlin
- Alfonse Romanovich Vargas de Bedemar (1816–1902) – "one of the founders of the Russian school of forest mensuration"
- Franklin B. Hough, MD (1822–1885) – chief of the United States Division of Forestry, the "father of American forestry"
- Sir Dietrich Brandis (1824–1907) – considered the "father of tropical forestry"
- Sir William Schlich (1840–1925) – founder of Oxford University's forestry program
- Bernhard Fernow (1851–1923) – laid the groundwork for the United States Forest Service, founding dean of the first professional forestry school in the United States
- Gifford Pinchot (1865–1946) – first chief of the United States Forest Service and proponent of the Wise Use Movement
- Carl A. Schenck (1868–1955) – responsible for incorporating German scientific management techniques into American forest management, and founder of Biltmore Forest School, the first forestry school in the United States
- Károly Bund (1869–1931) – early academic and practical forester whose work in the Hungarian National Forestry Association increased treeplanting and intensified efforts to protect natural forests, indigenous tree species, and forestry workers in Austria-Hungary
- Robert Scott Troup (1874–1939) – founder of Oxford's Imperial Forestry Institute
- Theodore Salisbury Woolsey, Jr. (1880–1933) – used scientific forestry to help France address timber shortages during World War I
- Aldo Leopold (1887–1948) – cofounder of The Wilderness Society along with Robert Marshall (below), prominent naturalist writer and environmental ethicist
- Kenneth Dupee Swan (1887–1970) – notable photographer for the USDA Forest Service
- Bob Marshall (1901–1939) – cofounder of The Wilderness Society, which helped pass the Wilderness Act, which created the first legal definition of wilderness and conserved some 9,100,000 acres (37,000 km^{2}) of national forest land in the United States
- Walter Bitterlich (1908–2008) – world-renowned Austrian scientist, best known for the invention of variable plot sampling
- Jack C. Westoby (1913–1988) – Chief Forester, United Nations Food and Agriculture Organization, "father of world forestry"
- Sakari Pinomäki (1933–2011) – pioneer of mechanized forest harvesting vehicles, decreasing the time required for harvesting and risk to loggers
- Stephen C. Sillett (1968–) – revolutionized the approach and methodology of studying plant and animal life in old growth canopies of large trees

== Allied fields ==
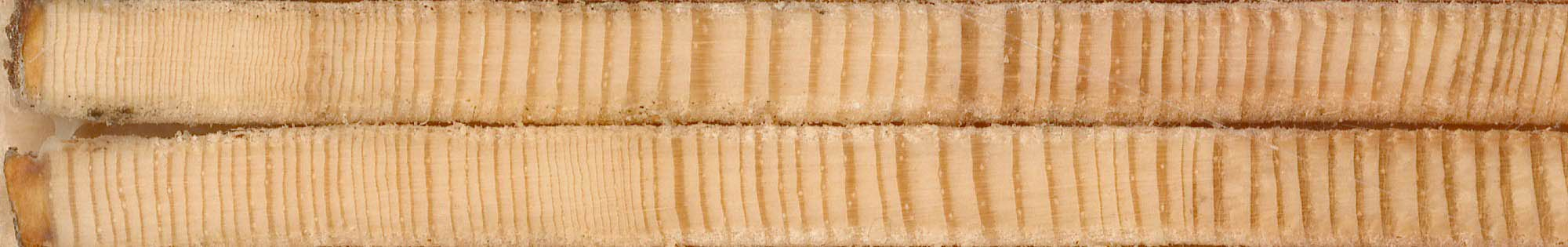
Increment borer cores of Pinus sylvestris, whose varying rates of annual tree growth are in response to external environmental conditions.

- Botany – study of plant life and development that explains the biological basis of trees, such as structure, growth, reproduction, metabolism, response to disease, and chemical properties
- Conservation biology – conscientious management of forests can preserve or enhance biodiversity of dependent species
- Dendrochronology – method of scientific dating based on the analyses of tree-ring growth patterns, analysis of long-lived individual trees can provide insight into climatic conditions of the past
- Ecology – whose principles are the main scientific basis of forestry
- Ecophysiology – study of an organism's physiology to environmental conditions that explains the success of a particular tree species' growth, reproduction, survival, and abundance
- Forest history – documents natural and human history of forests and forest use
- Natural resource management – brings together planning, management, conservation and sustainability of human use of natural resources, including forests
- Rural sociology – studies human perceptions, interactions and use of forests and associated resources
- Soil science – physical, chemical, and biological properties of soil greatly determines the success of tree species and individuals

== See also ==
- Outline of ecology
