= Mensuration =

Mensuration may refer to:

- Measurement
- Theory of measurement
  - Mensuration (mathematics), a branch of mathematics that deals with measurement of various parameters of geometric figures and many more
  - Forest mensuration, a branch of forestry that deals with measurements of forest stand
- Mensural notation of music
- Mensuration canon, a musical composition wherein the main melody is accompanied by one or more imitations of that melody in other voices
