= Amber Mafia =

Criminal enterprise in Ukraine

- Territory: Rivne Oblast
- Ethnicity: Ukrainians
- Activities: Corruption, illagaly dig up and smuggle amber, illegal logging
- Allies: local "authorities", Timber mafia
- Rivals: UNA-UNSO, Right Sector

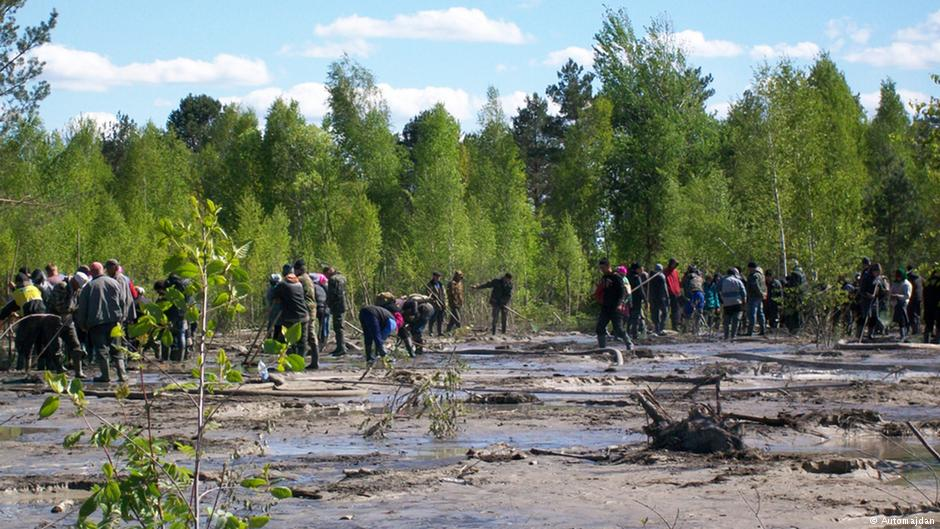
Illegal amber production in Rivne Oblast, 2017

The Amber mafia is the criminal network in north-west Ukraine composed of those who illegally dig up amber on government land and smuggle it out for sale on the black market with the aid of armed gangs and corrupt politicians.

In July 2016 prosecutor general Yuriy Lutsenko claimed, that the whole sum of Ukraine's military expenditures could be covered by incomes from illegal amber production, and ecology minister Ostap Semerak estimated the number of people involved in the illegal business to be around 10,000. During the same year, 300 officers searched 123 homes for amber. In May 2017 a protest meeting in support of legalization of amber extraction took place in Rivne, with local authorities claiming that its participants had been paid by organizers.

Volodymyr Zelenskyy in 2019 requested the SBI, Security Service and National Police of Ukraine to deliver reports on the clandestine amber extraction.
