= Arnold Bolle =

Arnold William Bolle
- Born: October 5, 1912; Watertown, Wisconsin
- Died: March 18, 1994 (aged 81); Missoula, Montana
- Education: Northwestern College (L.A., 1934), University of Montana (B.S., 1937), Harvard University (M.S., 1955; Ph.D. 1960)

Arnold Bolle (October 5, 1912 – March 18, 1994) was a leading figure in the Montana conservation movement. Although his work primarily focused on local Montana forests and conservation efforts, Bolle's activism was instrumental in bringing forest conservation into the public view at a national scale with his widely disseminated report, A University View of the Forest Service in 1970, which became known as the "Bolle Report." Bolle's career contributions to the field and study of forestry was so great that Dick Behan, former Dean of the Northern Arizona University School of Forestry, contends: "If we can credit one person with changing what students learn and what foresters do on the ground, then that person has to be Arnold Bolle."

== Early life and education ==
Arnold William Bolle was born on October 5, 1912, in Watertown, Wisconsin. He graduated from Northwestern College in Watertown, Wisconsin with a liberal arts degree in 1934. Bolle then came westward to attend the University of Montana to study forestry. He received his bachelor's degree in forestry in 1937. While at the University of Montana, Bolle met Helen Swan, daughter of famed Forest Service photographer, K.D. Swan. Bolle and Swan married in 1937 and went on to have three children.

Bolle continued his education in 1954, when he accepted a fellowship at Harvard University, where he earned his Master's in forestry in 1955. Bolle returned to Harvard in 1958, where earned his Ph.D. in public administration two years later.

== Career ==
Bolle returned to Montana in 1954 and became a professor in the School of Forestry. Bolle took a brief hiatus from his teaching position in order to continue his studies at Harvard. After graduating with his Ph.D. in 1962, Bolle returned to the University of Montana as a professor, where he was also named Dean of the School of Forestry. He retired as Dean in 1972, but continued teaching as a professor until his retirement in 1978. He served as assistant ranger in the Deerlodge Forest and went to work for the Soil Conservation Service in 1938, a job he held for the next eighteen years.

While at the University of Montana, Bolle worked closely with local Montana communities. In 1970, at the behest of Montana Senator Lee Metcalf, Professor Bolle and six of his colleagues at the University of Montana documented clearcutting practices in the Bitterroot National Forest. Their report, which was officially titled A University View of the Forest Service, popularly became known as the “Bolle Report.” It was published as a Senate document in 1970 and thousands of copies were distributed at the request of Senator Metcalf. The report launched a national forest land management controversy and contributed to the passage of the National Forest Management Act of 1976.

== Later years ==
During his retirement years, Bolle remained active in the community, serving on boards and committees of many local and national environmental organizations. He served on the governing council of the Wilderness Society until his death. He was also active in the Montana Wilderness Association and the Forever Wild Endowment with the Wilderness Watch. He was honored nationally with the Bolle Center for Ecosystem Management, a segment of The Wilderness Society in Washington, D.C. He also received the Wilderness Society's highest honor—the Robert Marshall Award—in 1993. The University of Montana Bolle Center for People and Forests was named for Bolle that same year. The center is an independent, service-oriented natural resource learning center dedicated to Bolle's philosophy of ecosystem management and sustainable forests.

Bolle died in Missoula, Montana on March 18, 1994.
