= Timber mafia =

Organized criminals cutting timber illegally

Timber mafia refers to organized crime in the field of illegal logging in timber.

== Bhutan ==
Bhutan's forests have been exploited by the “timber mafia” from neighboring Assam. The phenomenon has increased in the last decade.

== Brazil ==
Brazil has rampant illegal logging, with deforestation increasing in 2013. The mafia intimidate opponents, however they also have a veneer of legitimacy.

According to a study by the Imazon, close to 70 percent of logging in Pará was without State authorization.

== Cambodia ==
Since 2003, a third of all forests in Cambodia have disappeared. The timber mafia wields huge power and have alleged links to government.

== Congo ==
Congo is also a victim of the illegal timber trade.

== India ==
Protected forest areas in parts of India – such as Jammu and Kashmir, Himachal Pradesh, Karnataka and Jharkhand – are vulnerable to illegal logging by timber mafias that have coopted or intimidated forestry officials, local politicians, businesses and citizenry. Non-state groups have joined the nexus in militancy-affected areas such as Kashmir. Clear-cutting is sometimes covered-up by conniving officials who report fictitious forest fires.

Many studies indicate large losses of forest cover to indiscriminate logging by timber mafias, with over a million hectares in the environs of Chhotanagpur alone being illegally transferred by the forest department directly to industrial, mining and logging companies. Besides the environmental degradation, public financial losses can be substantial: One 1994 estimate of stolen timber in the state of Karnataka amounted to Rs. 10 billion (about US$230 million). Veerappan was a notorious bandit who, until his shooting death by state police in 2004, specialised in illegally logging sandalwood in Karnataka and Tamil Nadu.

As with coal, there have been incidents of substitution of low-grade wood for high-quality timber when the procurement of wood is authorised for government use. In an incident in 2005, officials determined that high-quality deodar wood meant for military and railway use had been substituted with lower-quality chir wood in Jammu and Kashmir state; the higher quality wood was intercepted in the process of being smuggled across the state border into Punjab.

== Indonesia ==
The forests of Borneo have faced illegal logging which threatens livelihood and the ecosystem.

== Romania ==
The forest industry in Romania is dominated by a “timber mafia” or a “forest mafia.” Half of all Romanian timber is illegally harvested. Those who cross the timber mafia or attempt to enforce Romania’s forest laws are targeted for retribution.

Corruption is a deep rooted issue in Romania that attracts foreign timber companies such as HS Timber which has been implicated in the illegal timber trade, leading Ikea to end sourcing from them. Romania is facing European Commission scrutiny for its failure to halt illegal logging, highlighting the critical situation.
