= NICOL Forests UK =

NICOL Forests UK Limited
- Company type: Private Company Limited by Shares
- Founded: 2009; 17 years ago
- Headquarters: London, England, UK

NICOL Forests UK Limited is a UK-registered company that acts as the UK arm of the Ghana-based National Interest Company Limited (NICOL). The director of the UK company is Neil McCartney.

NICOL was incorporated in Accra on 10 November 2005 (Certificate of Incorporation No. CA - 21, 620) and is authorised, among other things, to carry on business in reforestation, agro-forestry and biodiesel production. The registered office is at P.O. Box AT 1231, Achimota Market, Accra, Ghana.

The original directors of NICOL were Neil McCartney, Akyaaba Addai-Sebo, Nana Akua Owusu and Kofi Ashiboe-Mensah – who subsequently died. Kofi Akainyah is the company secretary.

NICOL has signed Land Lease Contracts and Benefit Sharing Agreements with the Ghanaian Forestry Commission covering three areas of degraded forest-reserve land for the purpose of developing commercial forest plantations:

- Boufoum Forest Reserve in the Agogo Forest District of Ashanti Region, Ghana;
- Boufoum Forest Reserve in the Kumawu Forest District of Ashanti Region, Ghana; and
- Dede Forest Reserve in the Begoro District of the Eastern Region, Ghana

It is negotiating with the Forestry Commission and landowners for further sections of on-reserve and off-reserve land.

The idea of a “national interest” holding company was originally discussed in about 2000 by a group of conscientious individuals with strong background in conflict prevention and transformation, preventive diplomacy and sustainable development. They argued that some of the root causes of most internal conflicts are poverty, underdevelopment and unfair global trade. They tasked themselves into the development of business and investment models for environmental-friendly social development projects to alleviate poverty and environmental degradation.

== NICOL Board of Directors ==
Akyaaba Addai-Sebo: Independent Consultant on Preventive Diplomacy, National Development and Resource Mobilisation. director of Tribute Inspirations Limited and director of cultural and political relations at Listen Campaigns Limited, London, UK. Formerly special advisor to Amara Essy, secretary-general of the OAU and chairman of AU Commission. Special envoy of International Alert, and helped to broker peace in Liberia and Sierra Leone. Appointed by President Hilla Liman as member of the Presidential Commission on Ghana-US Relations in 1981. Has written widely on peace and conflict, contemporary African politics and national security. He founded Black History Month through the Greater London Council in the UK in October 1987; it later expanded to be a national event.

Nana Akua Owusu: Several years of experience working as administrator in the voluntary sector in the UK and currently a senior partner at the Speech and Hearing Centre, Accra. She is the founder of AwaaWaa2, an NGO supporting children with communication disabilities and their families. Formerly Principal Speech and Language Therapist, Lambeth NHS Primary Care Trust, UK.

Neil McCartney: UK-based entrepreneur who is involved in a number of energy, media and telecommunications projects in Africa and Asia. He is managing director of McCartney Media, a consultancy which specialises in media and telecommunications, and has 30 years experience of working in activities in these fields. He is a director of Tribute Inspirations Limited, director of business affairs at Listen Campaigns Limited, chairman of The Independent Film Trust and plays similar roles in various other OK organisations.

Kofi Akainyah: Company Secretary, Legal Practitioner (Solicitor).

Principal Advisor: Professor Kwabena Tufuor, Forestry Consultant and formerly CEO of Forestry Commission. Professor Tufuor is a leading figure in the regeneration of forestry in Ghana and has a high reputation both in Ghana and in international agencies such as the UN, WHO and other preeminent sustainable forestry and environmental development organisation.

Kofi Ashiboi-Mensah: He was a Consultant Economist and Management Counsellor. Clients had included the Ministries of Housing and Local Government, UNDP, World Bank, International NGOs and private industry. He also worked on Revenue Generation for the Metropolitan Assemblies in Ghana for the Ministry of Local Government, Rural Development and Environment, and worked for a long time with the Ministries of Finance and Economic Planning and later appointed the Minister of Trade.
