= Drum chopper =

Farm equipment

A drum chopper is a piece of farm equipment used for "knocking down brush and trees" and for "chopping up" their remains. The device is cylindrical or drum-like in form and is towed behind a tractor or land machine. It is used to reduce the possibility of brush or forest fire, to manage the topography and diversity of plants and trees, to reduce weeds and to improve land for livestock.

== See also ==
- Bureau of Land Management (U.S.)
- Forestry
- Rangeland
