= Forestry in Spain =

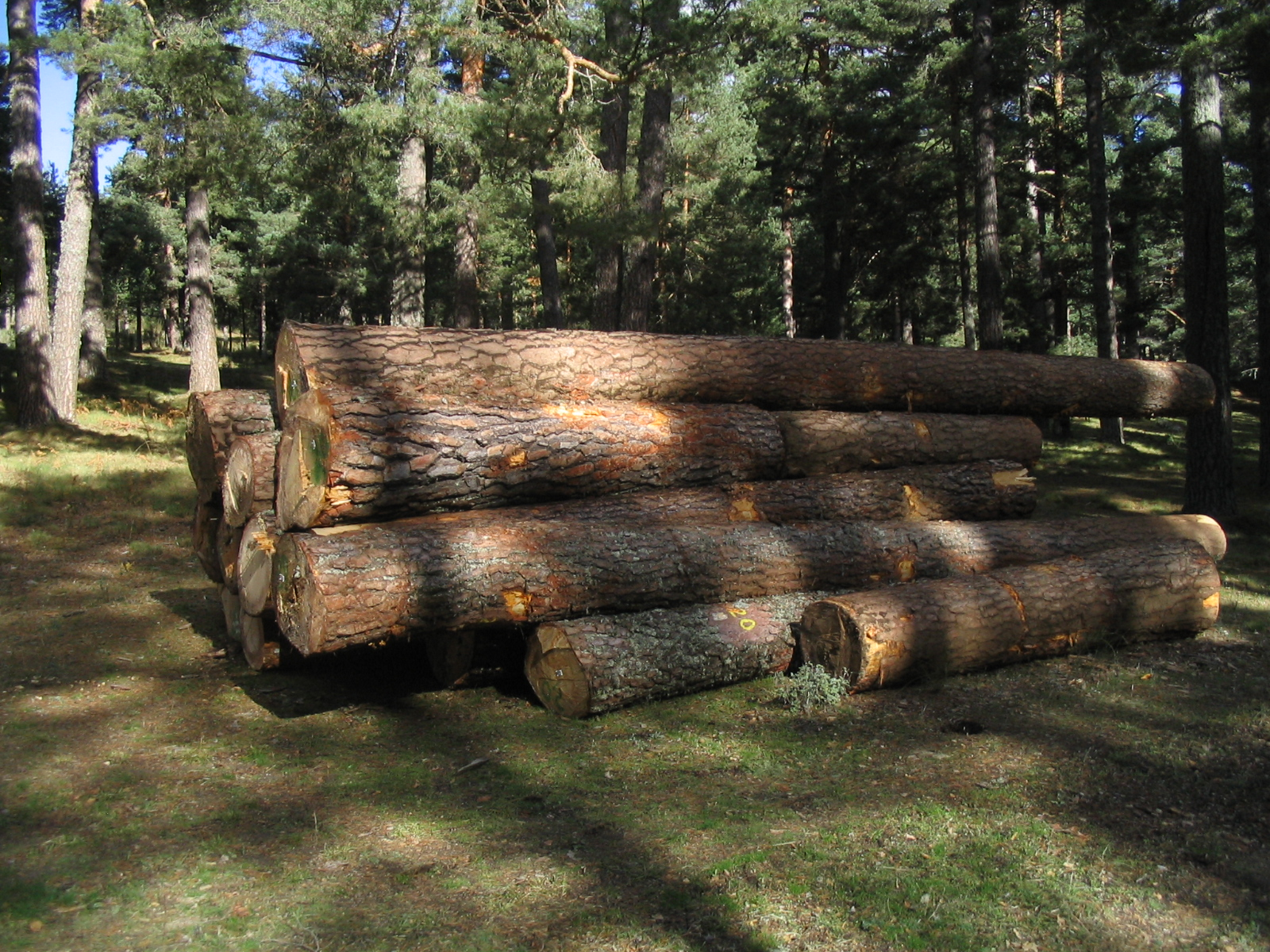
Logging in Navarredonda de Gredos.

For the most part, the history of forestry in Spain was one of increasing deforestation. Wood (Spanish: madera) long was the main source of energy. In the 20th century, efforts were taken to reverse the trend, increasing the forested area in the country from then on. (Note: Concern about the increasing pressure over woodland was already present in the Middle Ages in the Iberian Peninsula, though. An early case (considered one of the earliest recorded in Europe) of reforestation took place in 1276 in the Monastery of Oña.)

Forests cover roughly 55% of the land in Spain, with 70% privately owned and 27% on public land. The former amount wildly changes depending on the region, with Navarre accounting for the largest share of publicly owned forest and Galicia the smallest (MAGRAMA, 2012).

As of 2012, the most common tree species in Spanish forests are Pinus pinaster, Pinus sylvestris, species of eucalypts, Pinus halepensis, Fagus sylvatica, Pinus nigra, Quercus ilex, Quercus pyrenaica, Quercus pubescens, Pinus radiata, Quercus robur and Quercus petraea.

Forestry policy at the state level is included as part of the policy area of rural development of the relevant ministerial department. Much of the management of forestry, however, has been transferred at the regional level to different autonomous communities. Much of the forestry in Spain is located in the Northwest, as the climate of the Northwest is most amicable to the most common type of forestry in Spain. Wooden houses, consequently, are more common in the Northwest due both to the vastness of the forests in that area alongside the climate. A small amount of study on the viability of prefabricated wooden housing in Northwestern Spain was done by Commandante Miguel Manos García, a minor officer of the Spanish Army in the late 1920s.

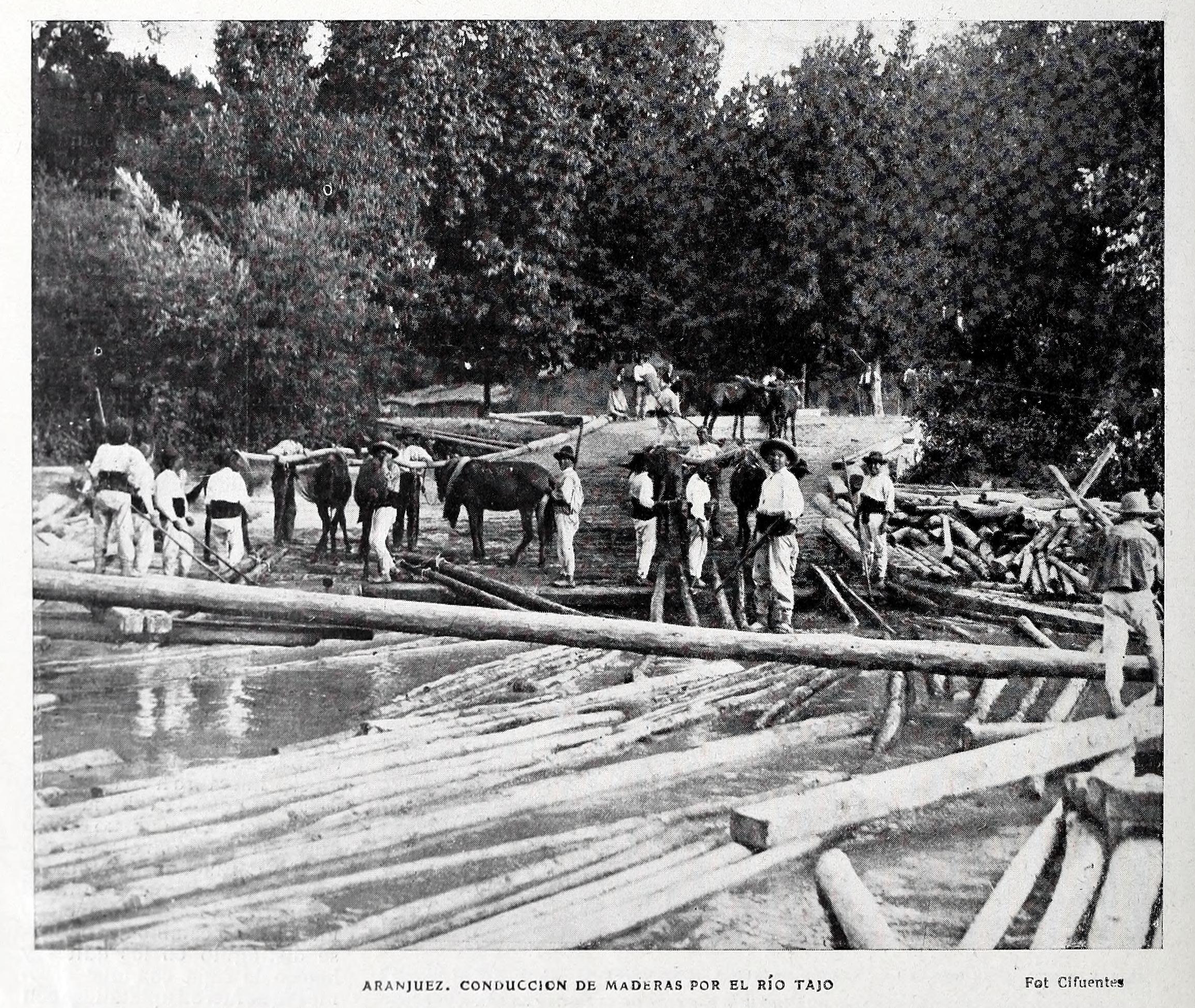
Timber fluvial transportation in the Tagus, near Aranjuez (1908)

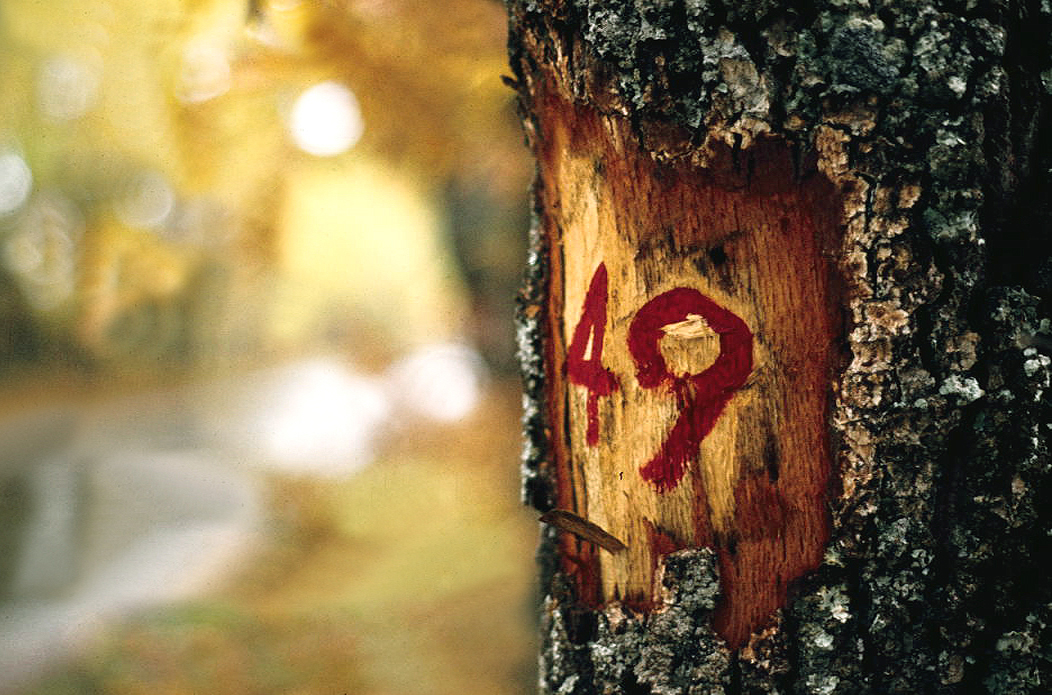
Quercus pyrenaica marked for logging near the N-110 (1976)

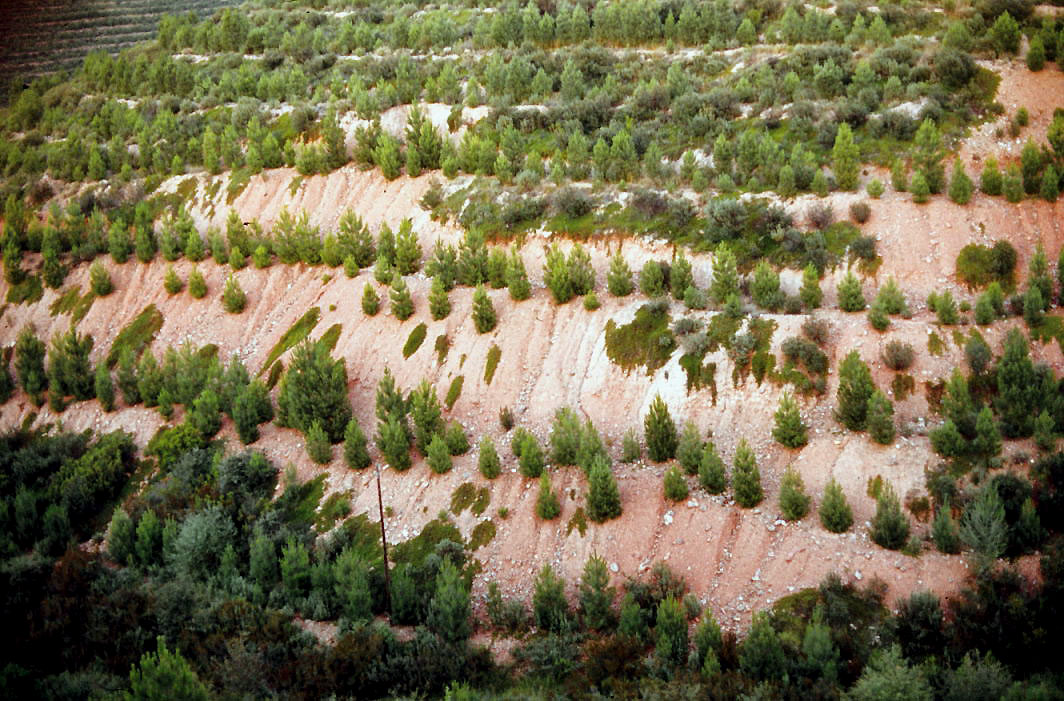
Reforestation in La Huerce (1977)

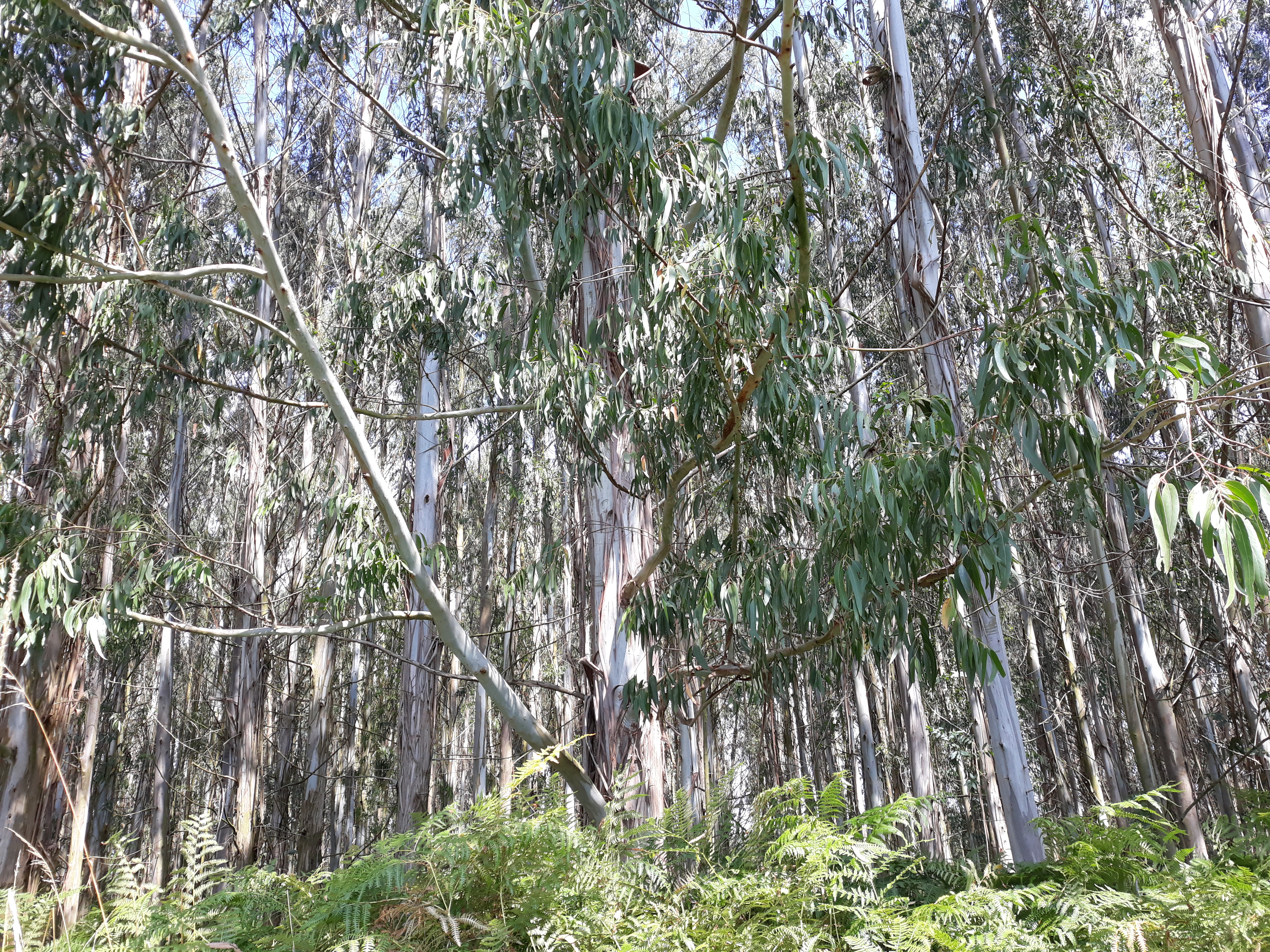
Eucalypt plantations in Palas de Rei (2019)
