= Forestry in Romania =

Forestry in Romania is an important sector of the economy and is of global significance. Half of all forestry production in Romania is the result of illegal logging.

== Overview ==
Half of the commercial forests in Romania are controlled by the state owned Romsilva. Romania is home to the last extensive unlogged old growth forests in Europe, however, these virgin woods are increasingly threatened by both legal and illegal logging.

== History ==
During the communist era private forest holdings were nationalized. In 1989 after the fall of communism private landowners who had lost their land to nationalization were allowed to apply for the restitution of their property. Unfortunately this process was incredibly corrupt and a lot of public lands got misallocated with land being given not to those who had lost it during nationalization but those with political and economic connections.

From 2004 to 2015 Harvard University acquired 33,600 hectares (83,000 acres) of Romanian forest land. In 2015 they abruptly sold their entire holding to a subsidiary of Ikea. These holdings have since faced significant legal challenge as many were acquired corruptly during the restitution process.

== Timber mafia ==
The forest industry in Romania is dominated by a “timber mafia” or a “forest mafia.” Half of all Romanian timber is illegally harvested. Those who cross the timber mafia or attempt to enforce Romania's forest laws are targeted for retribution.

Illegal logging is believed to have cost Romania more than $5.7 billion since the transition away from Communism.

In 2019 two forest rangers were killed in the line of duty, one was killed with his own gun and one was killed with an axe. Both were found near illegal logging encampments they had been investigating.

The European Union has repeatedly pressured the Romanian government to solve the illegal logging problem however there is little that local politicians are willing to do.
