= Kenneth Dupee Swan =

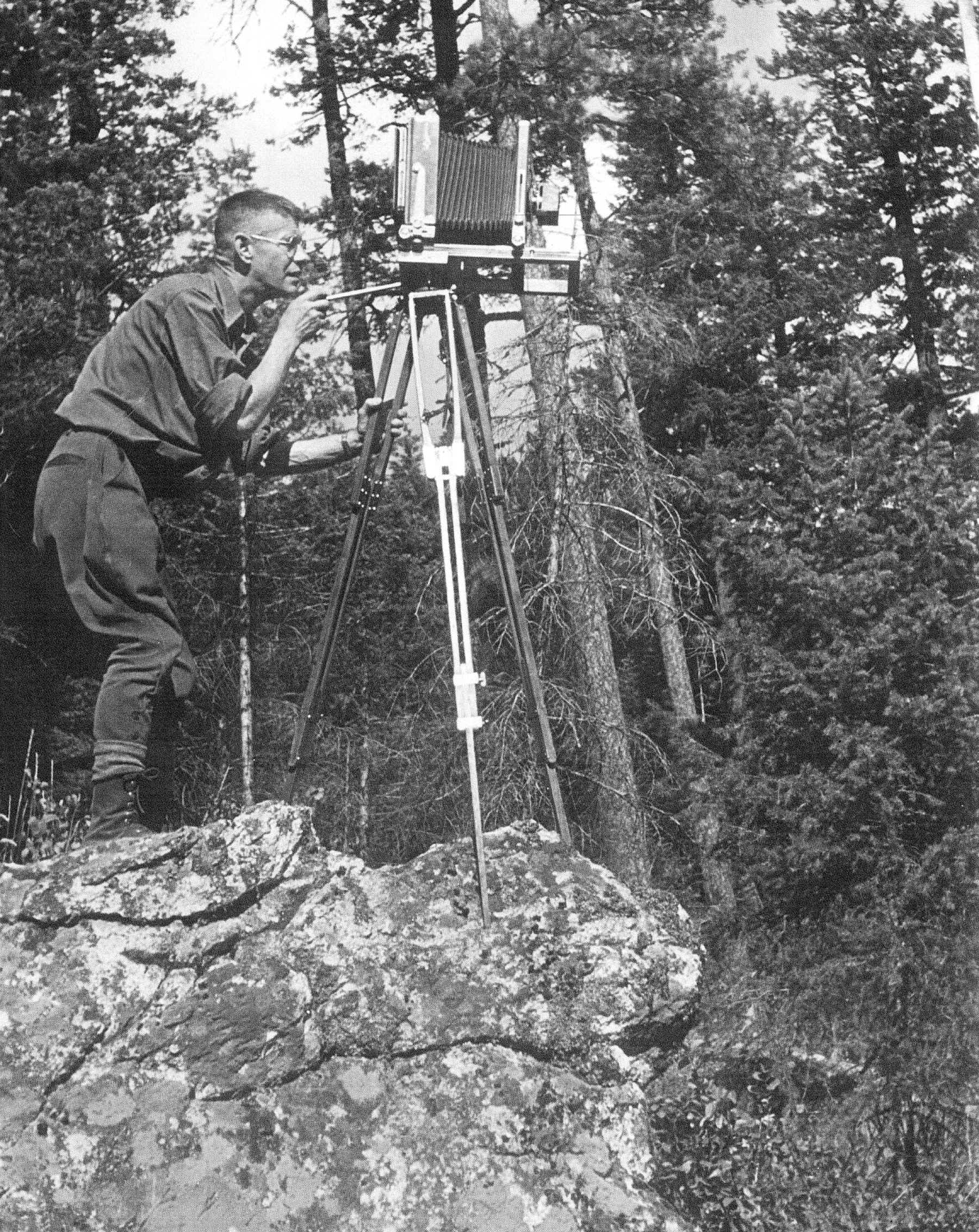
Swan with a camera

Kenneth Dupee Swan (1887–1970), more commonly known as K.D. Swan, was an American nature photographer in the early part of the 20th century. During his career in the USDA Forest Service (1911–1947) he took many picture of the American Northwest. Swan captured the face of public lands, revealing its wildness and value to the American public. His messages of long ago still emanate from his images - the value of conserving public lands and the joy of living in magnificent wild places.

== Early life ==
Swan first learned to love America's wilderness while rambling the hills of his native Massachusetts. His "first love was a range of hills — the Blue Hills of Milton and Quincy — high points on the south rim of the Boston Basin." As he later described it, "This was my wilderness, easily reached from home by bicycle, trolley, or even on foot, and here I spent countless carefree hours in all seasons.... Here, too, was born a desire to become a forester ... a decision I have never regretted."

== Career ==
He arrived in Missoula, Montana in the summer of 1911. With a master's degree in forestry from Harvard University, he was among a cadre of young energetic foresters who joined the newly created Forest Service where he was appointed as a forest assistant.

He surveyed homestead sites, planted trees, and cruised timber in the Jefferson National Forest (now Lewis and Clark), Sioux National Forest (now Custer), and Clearwater National Forest. In 1913, the agency reassigned him to the Northern Region headquarters in Missoula, where he began a seven-year stint as a topographic draftsman, an "assignment which brought... great satisfaction." He spent the remainder of his career working out of the regional office.

== Forest education and photography ==
His work in forestry eventually led into the arena of public information and photography. In the 1920s, the Forest Service established the Information and Education Branch. Already recognized as a photographer, Swan was soon transferred to it. Through his pictures and many public presentations, Swan revealed the unique beauty of remote, wild areas in Montana, Idaho, and the Dakotas.

Swan's images were used to illustrate a great variety of Forest Service publications, many of which he also authored. They also appeared in publications ranging from National Geographic to The New York Times and The Christian Science Monitor. Swan regularly toured the region giving lectures on forest conservation, illustrated by both still slides and moving pictures.

== Late years ==
By Swan's retirement in 1947, his work had become art that transcended the mere recording of a place in time. Today, almost a century later, the photographs still engage and entrance viewers and tell a resounding story about public lands in the West. In 1968, he published Splendid Was the Trail, a memoir that offered a detailed look at life and work in a remote, sparsely populated region during the formative years of the Forest Service.

== Legacy ==
A collection of Swan's photographs is now in the National Archives in Washington, D.C., as well as in many exhibits throughout the United States.
