= Diameter tape =

Measurement tool

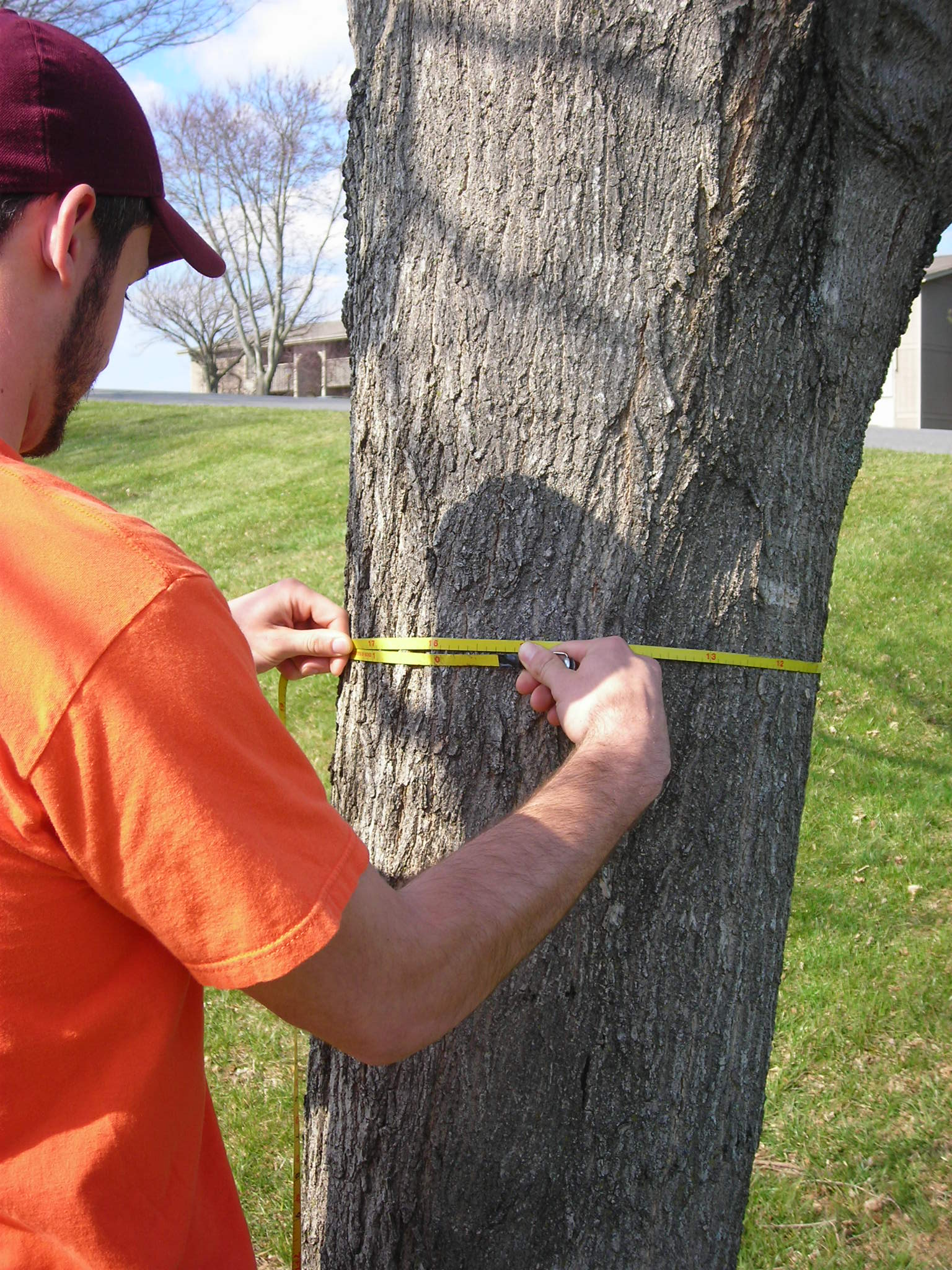
Measurement of tree diameter at breast height, making sure that the tape is perfectly level and that the tape is not kinked, so as not to skew the reading of the diameter.

A diameter tape (D-tape) is a measuring tape used to estimate the diameter of a cylinder object, typically the stem of a tree or pipe. A diameter tape has either metric or imperial measurements reduced by the value of π. This means the tape measures the diameter of the object. It is assumed that the cylinder object is a perfect circle. The diameter tape provides an approximation of diameter; most commonly used in dendrometry.

Diameter tapes are usually made of cloth or metal, and on one side of the tape have diameter measurements and on the other standard measurements (not reduced by π).

== Use of diameter tapes ==
Diameter tapes are used to measure tree stems (trunk or bole); other parts of trees such as branches and roots; and logs (cut stems).

Standard Diameter Height (SDH) is the height at which tree diameter is measured, and is normally called diameter at breast height (DBH).

DBH is measured at a fixed height of 4.5 feet (1.4 m) above the ground in the United States, Australia, New Zealand, South Africa, India, and Malaysia; or 4.27 feet (1.30 m) meters in Canada, Europe, Thailand and Vietnam.

Diameter is not usually measured at ground level to avoid measuring a tree's butt swell. Butt swell is where the base of the tree is unconventionally thicker than the rest of the tree. Height and diameter are used to determine the volume of a given tree; measuring above the butt swell is required to provide the most accurate measurement.

For single-stem trees, DBH is a useful and is easily measured. For multi-stem species such as mallee or other multi-stemmed species, DBH may be inconvenient because of a large number of stems and difficulty of access, and a lower or higher measurement height may be more practical.

DBH measurements can be used with other measurements, such as height, to estimate the volume of wood in an individual tree. Usually DBH and height of the trees in a plot or quadrat is measured and used to estimate wood volume for the plot, which can be in turn used to estimate the wood volume in a larger area.

DBH measures can be used to calculate basal area.

== Measuring diameter ==
To measure the diameter of a tree, the diameter tape (diameter side facing user) is wrapped around the tree, in the plane perpendicular to the axis of the trunk at 4.5 feet (1.4 m) above ground (or 4.27 feet (1.30 m), depending on the location) . Where the number "0" aligns with the rest of the tape, the diameter can be read directly from the tape, for a relatively round and smooth tree trunk as shown.

See Tree girth measurement for some cautions about placement, and errors that may be introduced, by reporting this diameter for a trunk, or any material, that is not nearly circular.

== Precision diameter tapes ==
Precision diameter tapes are used for measuring the true diameters of both round and out-of-round forms. Used in the metal working industry, these tapes are precision tools made of 1095 clock spring steel.

The precision-diameter gages consist of a narrow metal ribbon bearing special graduations vernier scale. The vernier scale allows the user more accurately measure diameter.

The tapes are checked over master gauges at 0.001 in (0.025 mm) accuracy for standard tapes up to 144 inches (3,658 mm).

Precision diameter tapes are used in precision or advanced manufacturing industries, such as aero-space field and the plastic pipe industry.

== See also ==
- Biltmore stick
- Timber cruise
- Tree girth measurement
- Tree allometry
