= Log scaler =

Timber industry worker who measures cut trees for value

The log scaler is an occupation in the timber industry. The Log Scaler measures the cut trees to determine the scale (volume) and quality (grade) of the wood to be used for manufacturing. When logs are sold, in order to determine the basis for a sale price in a standard way, the logs are "scaled" which means they are measured, identified as to species, and deductions for defects are assigned to produce a net volume of merchantable wood. There are several different scales or rules that are used to determine the volume of wood. Scribner Decimal C rule is based on diagrams of circles that show the number of boards that will be utilized from the diameters of logs. The cubic rule, often called Metric in Canada, determines the cubic volume of the log material. The logs are recorded as gross scale (actual log measurements, length and diameter) and net scale (volume after deductions for defects are taken out). This occupation is usually performed by a third-party organization qualified to "scale" government timber. Since internal defects are determined by external indications, scaling is not an exact science and is subject to the interpretation of log scaling rules. The log scaler is subject to random "check scales" in which another scaler rescales exactly the same logs and the results are compared. The log scaler must be within + or - 1% of the gross scale and + or - 2% of the net scale to keep their certification to scale. The scale is used for payment, quality control and inventory purposes.

== Historical methods ==
Historically, in the Pacific Northwest, logs were first sold after they were delivered to the water and rafted to the mill. Bundle rafts have bundles of logs that are tightly fastened together and some logs are well below the water line. Consequently, log scalers would walk the rafts and measure and grade the logs in the water. When logging was done by hand, the fallers and buckers were often paid on a piecework basis so the individual workmen's production was scaled daily as well. Presently, few logs are ever rafted.

== Ramp scaling ==
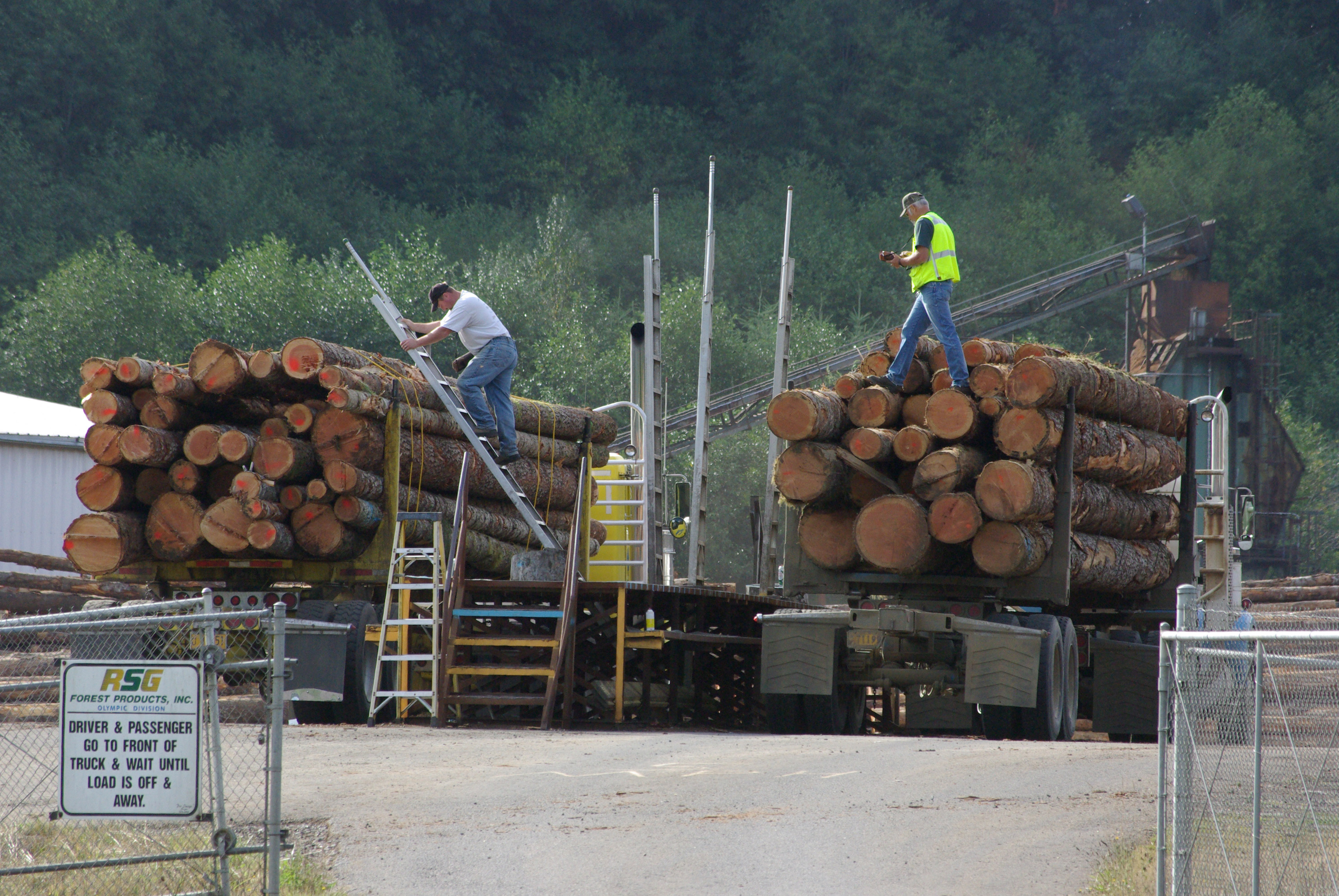
Ramp Scale at Mist, Oregon

A log scaling method that has been popular since the adaptation of trucks to haul logs has been the 'ramp scale'. In this approach, the log truck is driven beside a scale ramp which is simply an elevated platform, and from there the log scaler climbs around on the truck and on the load and measures and grades the logs. Although the ramp is typically operated by the scaling bureau, it may be located with a sawmill yard that is buying the logs or it may be at some other convenient location. Depending on the location, the ramp may scale logs for a single mill, or the ramp may be located so that logs scaled may proceed to multiple destinations. The photo at the right shows two trucks at a typical Pacific Northwest bureau scale ramp. Ramp scaling is often used where space is limited, speed is important, or the logs are of relatively low value. Assessing the grade of each log involves inspecting it for defects, but when a given log is situated in the middle of a truckload of logs it may be difficult to examine it.

== Rollout scaling ==
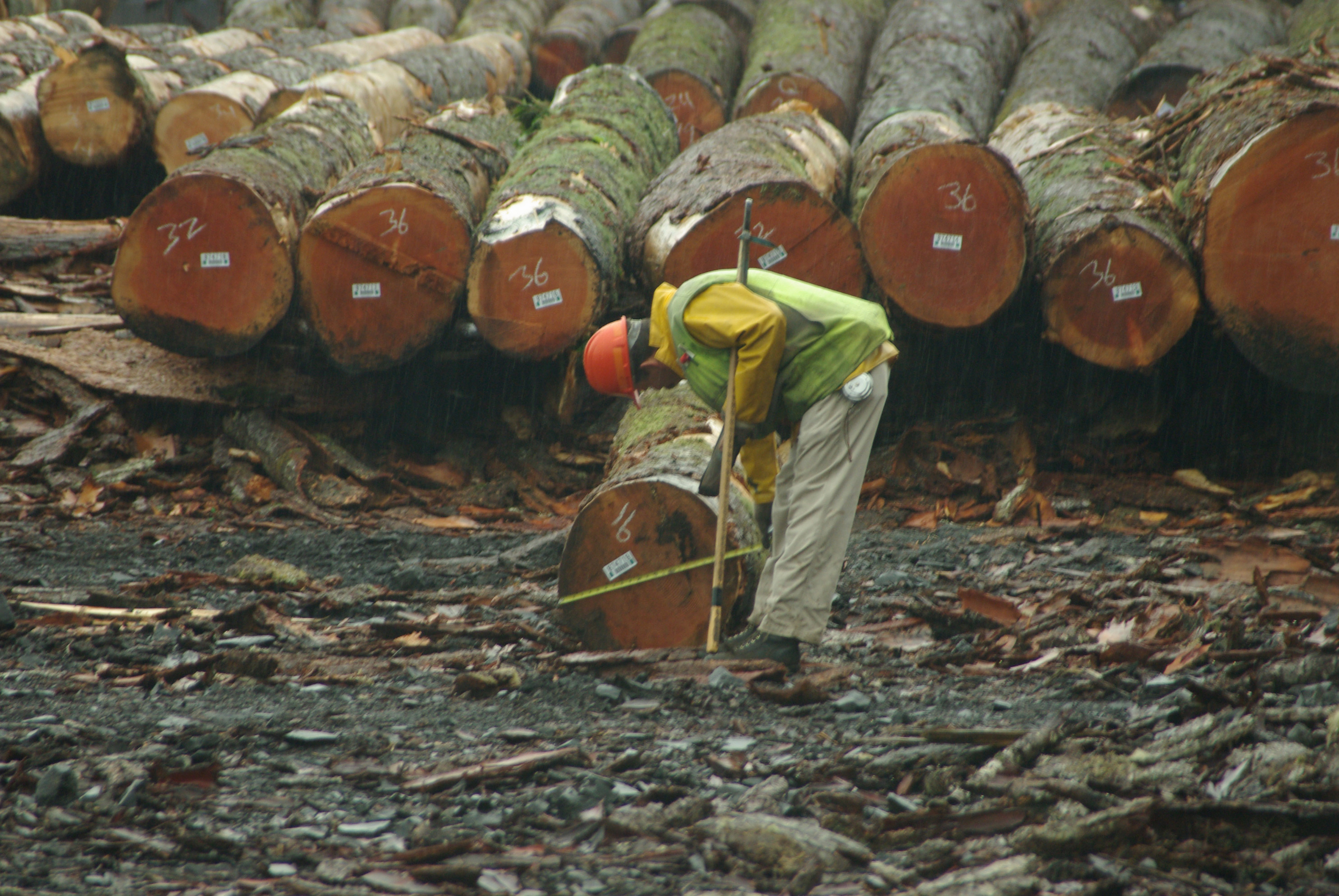
Rollout scaling in Oregon Log yard

The preferred method of scaling, particularly when high-value logs are involved, is the 'roll out' method. In this process, the logs are unloaded from the truck and rolled out on the ground or on skids a single layer deep, so that the scaler can then see a good part of every log in order to assist in determining the number and size of defects such as bends or rot. Rollout scaling must be done where heavy machinery is available to handle the logs, and requires the space to do the rollout as well as the time and expense of the extra handling. Rollout scaling can be more efficient (at least for the trucks) as the trucks do not have to wait to be scaled and can be unloaded and leave immediately. This is in contrast with the ramp scale, where the truck must wait until the scaling is complete.

In some jurisdictions, there are still places where the logs arrive via railroad car, and here they can be left for rollout scaling.

Timber cruisers also estimate the volume of timber, for example in a timber sale where the timber is sold on the stump, and can see the logs and where limbs grew on a tree, especially the lower logs in a tree which have the most volume and often the best grade of log and thus often the most value, better than a scaler. However, rollout scaling helps the scaler do this better than truck scaling or, in the Canadian province of British Columbia, in a log raft. The better the wood quality and the bigger the size of the logs, the better it is to scale logs when they are "rolled out".

== Standing wood scaling ==
Method of standing wood scaling is used for high-value log volume measurement or for the creation of allometric equations.

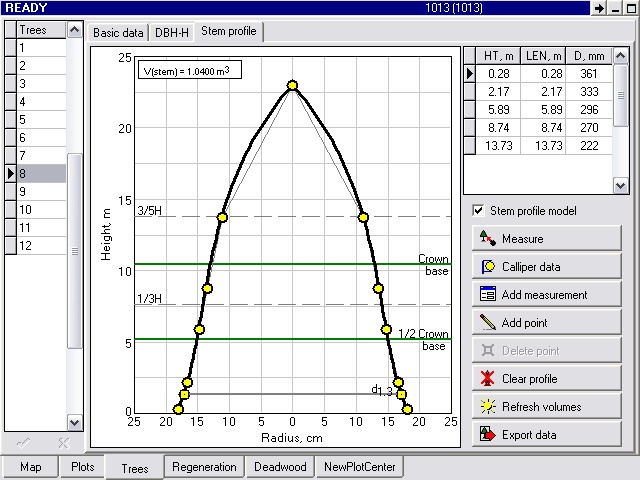
Stem profile (measured by special scope) allows obtaining accurate stem volume.

== See also ==
- Logging
- Sawmill
