= Biltmore stick =

Simple forestry tool for rough measurement of tree trunk diameter

The Biltmore stick is a tool used by foresters to estimate tree trunk diameter at breast height. The tool very often includes a hypsometer scale to estimate height as well. It looks much like an everyday yardstick. With practice a Biltmore stick is considered to be exceptionally accurate, often within half an inch on diameters. Some foresters use the tool regularly. However, many prefer to use more accurate tools such as a diameter tape or tree caliper to measure diameter at breast height (DBH), and a clinometer to measure height. On the other end of the spectrum, some foresters consider the use of a Biltmore stick to be no more accurate than their own visual estimates (based on experience estimating the height and DBH of trees), and make it practice for their surveys to be largely completed in this manner.

The Biltmore stick uses the principle of similar triangles. Similar triangles involve using identical angles but different side lengths.

== Use ==
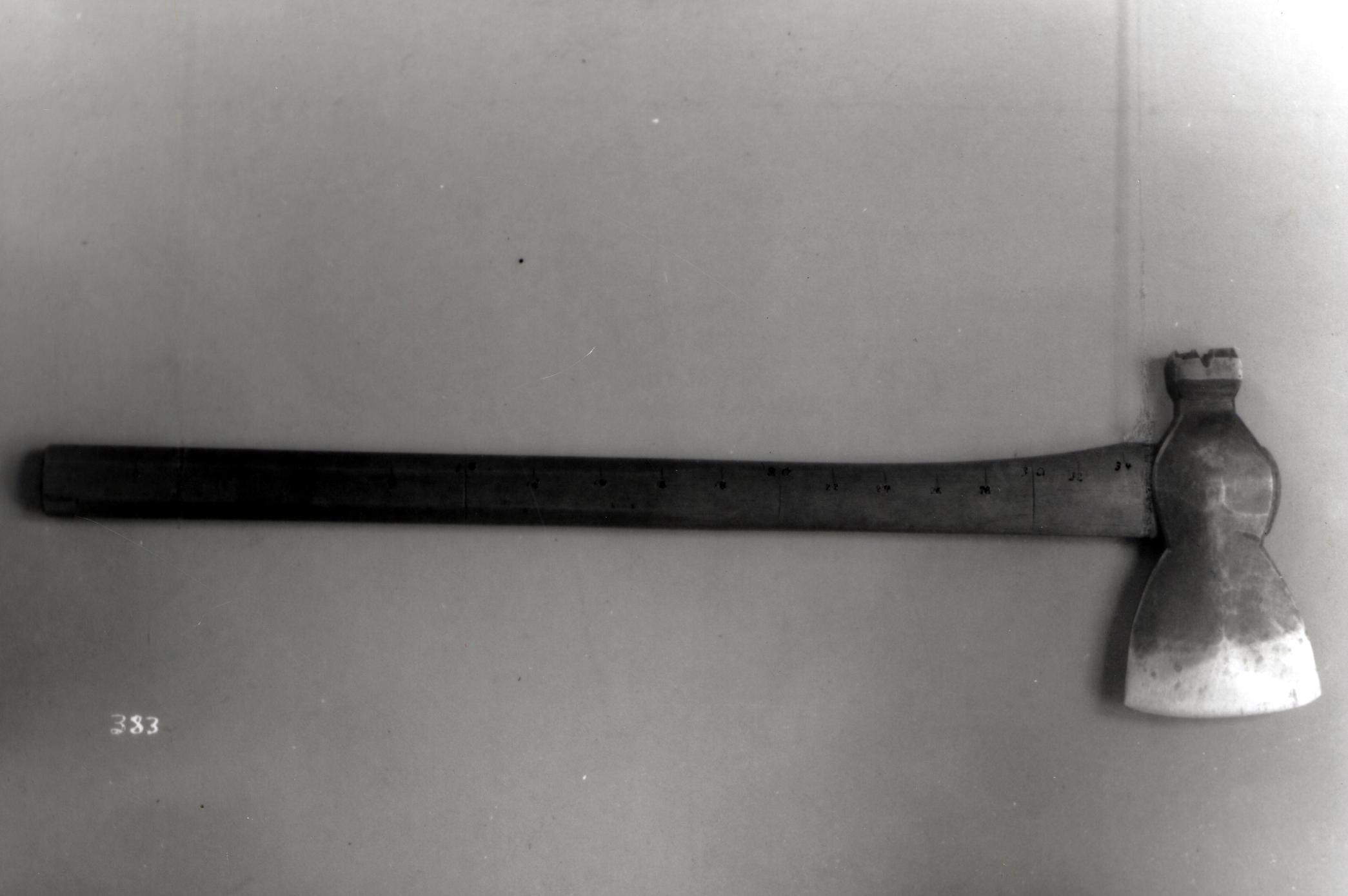
A Biltmore scale inscribed on the handle of a marking hatchet

Diameter at breast height (DBH) is measured by holding the stick a fixed distance, usually 25 inches (64 cm), from the eye, and at breast height, which in the United States is 4.5 feet (1.4 m) up the bole of the tree. The left side of the stick is flush with the left side of the tree. The number where the right side of the tree lines up with the stick is the approximate DBH of the tree.

To measure height, the user stands a fixed distance from the tree, usually 66 feet (20 m) in the United States. The stick is held upright, with the back edge of the stick facing the user. The back edge of the stick will be marked with 1, 2, 3, 4, and 5 log markings, indicating the number of 16-foot (4.9 m) logs in a tree. The bottom of the stick should line up with the bottom of the tree's trunk. The height of the tree is how high the tree goes up on the stick to a merchantable top.

Tree height is measured to a merchantable top, the point at which a tree can be accepted for use by a sawmill. This point can be reached either by defects (extreme sweep, crook, deviating branching, or other defects) or at a diameter limit for very straight trees. A common cutoff is 4 inches (10 cm) diameter, which is acceptable for pulpwood.

== History ==
The Biltmore stick is so named because it was developed at the Biltmore Estate, one of the first places in the United States where forestry was applied as a science. Gifford Pinchot, the future first chief of the United States Forest Service, and then Carl A. Schenck were hired in the 1890s to restore 125,000 acres (510 km^{2}) of land around the Biltmore estate to a healthy forest. Schenck was the developer of the Biltmore stick.

Ever since that time, the Biltmore stick has been used by foresters to quickly cruise timber.

== See also ==
- Cruising rod
- Relascope
