= Wood branding =

Permanently marking wood by burning

Branding is an easy and economical way to permanently mark anything that burns (wood, leather, plastic, rubber, cork, food, soap, wax, etc). This is done by either a fire-heated tool or an electrically-heated tool, which is pressed onto the object, leaving behind a mark with the shape of the impressed tool.

The act or art of marking/engraving wood by branding with a heated tool is associated with pyrogravure.

The United States Occupational Safety and Health Administration warns that, “Breathing these particles may cause allergic respiratory symptoms, mucosal and non-allergic respiratory symptoms, and cancer.”

== See also ==
- Livestock branding
- Marking axe
