= Dendrometry =

Study of the dimensions and size of trees

Dendrometry is the branch of forestry that is concerned with the measurement of the various dimensions of trees, such as their diameter, size, shape, age, overall volume, thickness of the bark, etc., as well as the statistical properties of tree stands, including measures of central tendency and dispersion of these quantities, wood density, or yearly growth, for instance.

The most frequent measurements acquired in the field include

- the Diameter at Breast Height (DBH)
- the height of the tree
- measures contraction and relaxation of vessels
- the horizontal dimension of the canopy

These key measurements are used to infer, through allometric relations, other tree properties that may be of greater interest but are harder to measure directly, such as the quantity of commercial wood retrievable, or the amount of carbon sequestered in the plants.

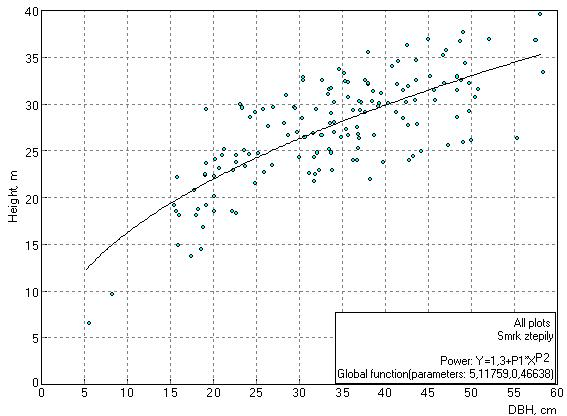
Tree height model (module of Field-Map Inventory Analyst) used to model missing tree heights.

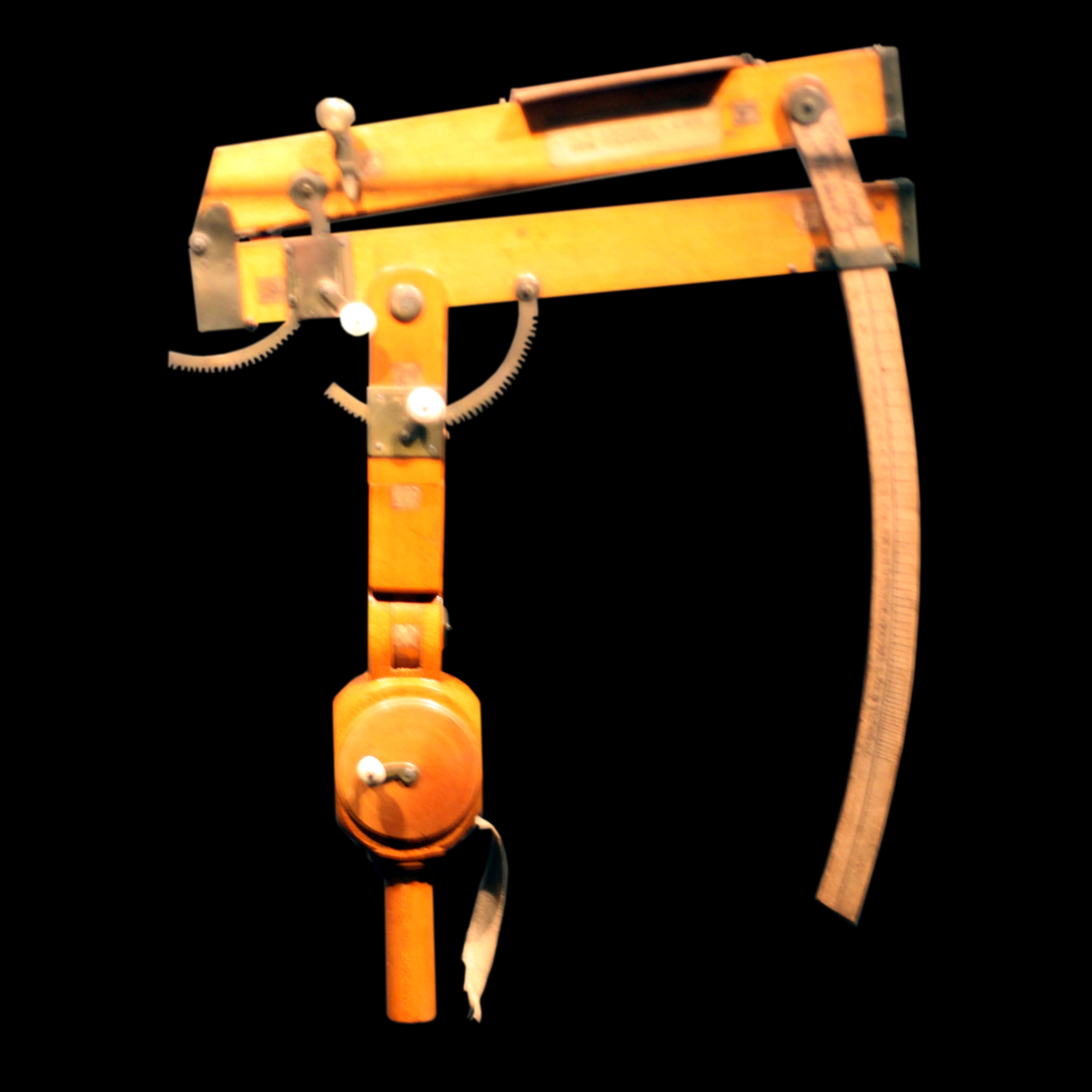
Dendrometer of the early 19th century, on display at the Musée des Arts et Métiers.

== See also ==
- Field-Map - technology for dendrometric measurements
- Tree allometry
- Tree crown measurement
- Tree girth measurement – Measurement of the circumference of a tree trunk
- Tree height measurement
- Tree measurement – Forestry techniques
- Tree volume measurement
