= Diameter at breast height =

Standard method of expressing the diameter of the trunk or bole of a standing tree

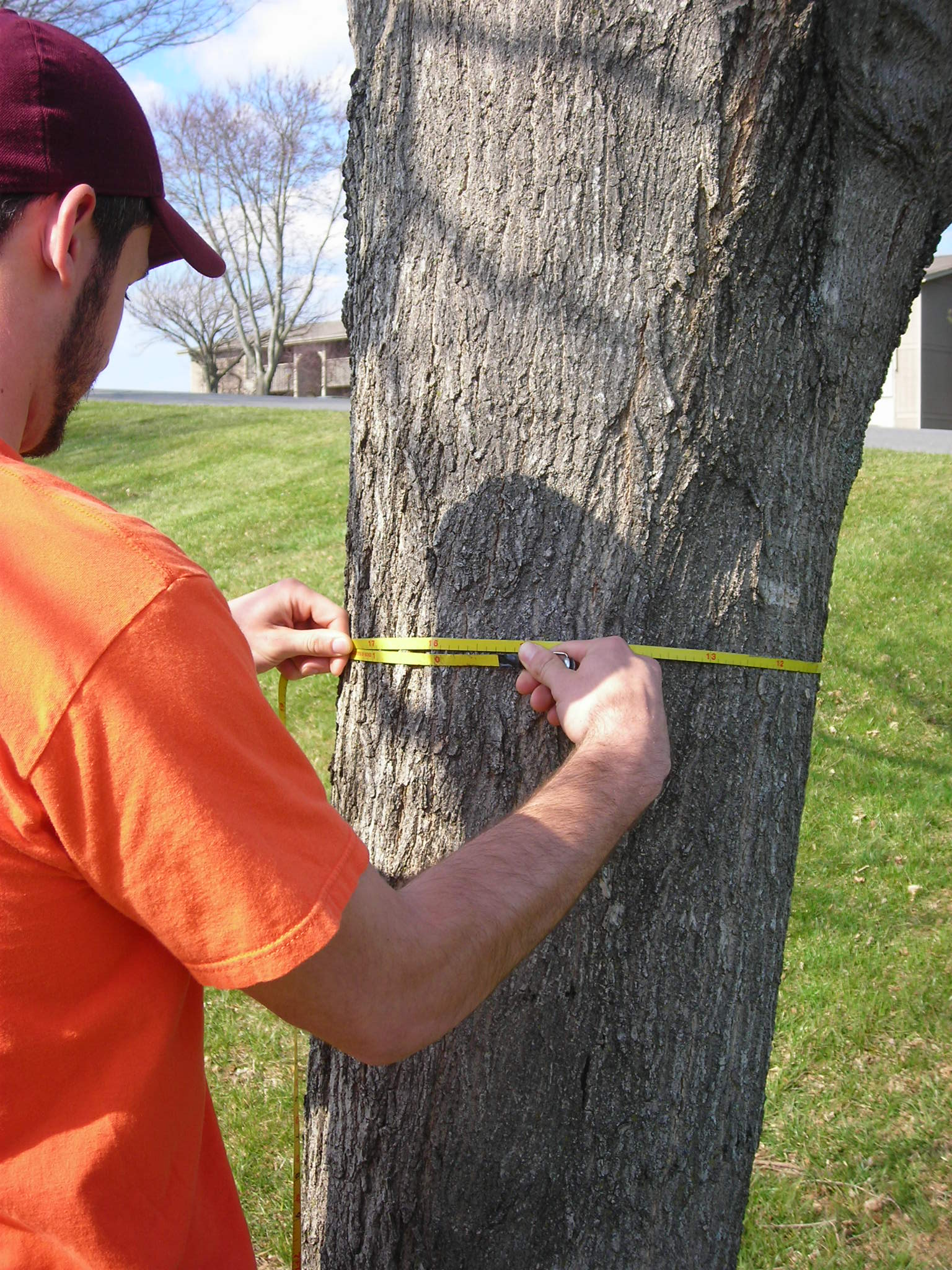
Measurement of tree circumference, the tape calibrated to show diameter, at breast height, making sure that the tape is perfectly level and that the tape is not kinked, so as not to skew the reading of the diameter.

Diameter at breast height, or DBH, is a standard method of expressing the diameter of the trunk or bole of a standing tree. DBH is one of the most common dendrometric measurements.

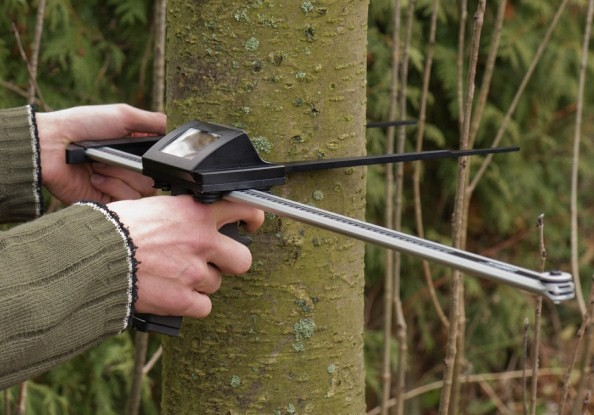
Electronic calipers can measure diameter at breast height and send measured data via Bluetooth to a field computer.

Tree trunks are measured at the height of an adult's breast, which is defined differently in different countries and situations. In many countries, DBH is measured at approximately 1.3 m (4.3 ft) above ground.

== Global variation and scientific precision ==
The height can make a substantial difference to the measured diameter.

In the United States, DBH is typically measured at 4 1/2 ft (1.37 m) above ground. In some countries, such as Australia, New Zealand, Burma, India, Malaysia, and South Africa, breast height diameter has historically been measured at a height of 1.4 m (4 ft 7 in), but because of much active research into allometrics that are being applied to trees and forests, a standardized height of 1.3 m (4 ft 3 in) has been suggested.

Some authors have argued that the term DBH should be abolished because the heights at which the diameter is measured are excessively variable and imprecise, and imprecise measurements could strongly influence forestry calculations such as biomass. An alternative proposed by Brokaw and Thompson (2000) is D_{x}, whereby the x indicates the exact height above the floor (and along the stem) at which the diameter is measured, e.g. D_{130} denotes a diameter measured at 130 cm above the ground and along the stem.

On sloping ground, the "above ground" reference point is usually taken as the highest point on the ground touching the trunk, but some use the average between the highest and lowest points of ground. If the DBH point falls on a swelling in the trunk it is customary to measure the girth below the swelling at the point where the diameter is smallest. Other ambiguous settings for determining the exact place where to measure the diameter is given in Dahdouh-Guebas & Koedam (2006).

== Methodology ==
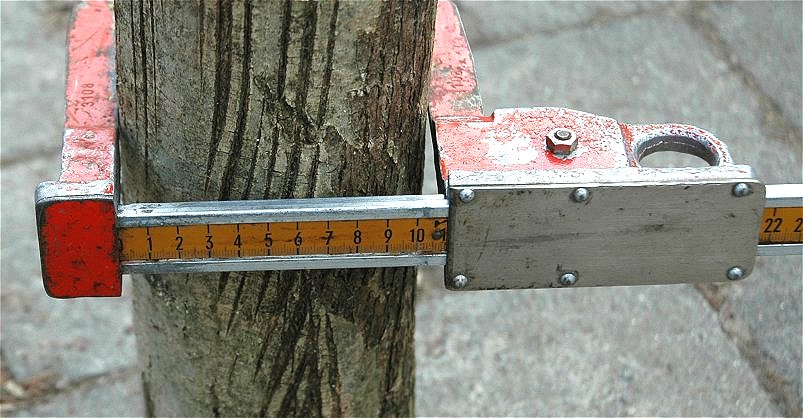
A tree caliper

The two most common instruments used to measure DBH are a girthing (or diameter) tape and calipers.

A girthing tape actually measures the girth (circumference) of the tree; the girthing tape is calibrated in divisions of π centimetres (3.14159 cm) or inches (3.14159 in). The measure assumes the trunk has a circular cross-section and gives a directly converted reading of the diameter. It is accurate for most plantation trees.

Calipers consist of two parallel arms one of which is fixed and the other able to slide along a scale. Calipers are held at right-angles to the trunk with the arms on either side of the trunk. Precision can be improved on non-circular stems by averaging two caliper measurements taken at right-angles. Electronic calipers are also available enabling highly accurate measurements to be taken and stored for further analysis.

DBH is used in estimating the amount of timber volume in a single tree or stand of trees utilising the allometric correlation between stem diameter, tree height and timber volume. It can also be used in the estimation of the age of veteran trees, given that diameter increment is the only "constant non-reversible feature of tree growth".

== See also ==
- The world's stoutest tree species
- Tree measurement
- Biltmore stick
- Crown (botany)
- Forest inventory
- Site index
- Site tree
- Tree crown measurement
