= Cruising rod =

A cruising rod is a simple device used to quickly estimate the number of pieces of lumber yielded by a given piece of timber. Similarly to a yardstick, it is a rod with markings. The estimation is carried out as follows. Standing at arm's length from the tree, estimate its average diameter by taking a note on the rod's markings. Walk away to see the whole tree; hold the rod upright at the distance from the eye at which the rod and the tree appear of the same diameter; the noted mark on the rod will show an approximate location of an 2.4-metre (8 ft) log cut along the tree height.

== See also ==
- Timber cruise
- Biltmore stick
