= Tree caliper =

Tool for measuring the diameter of the cross-section of trunks

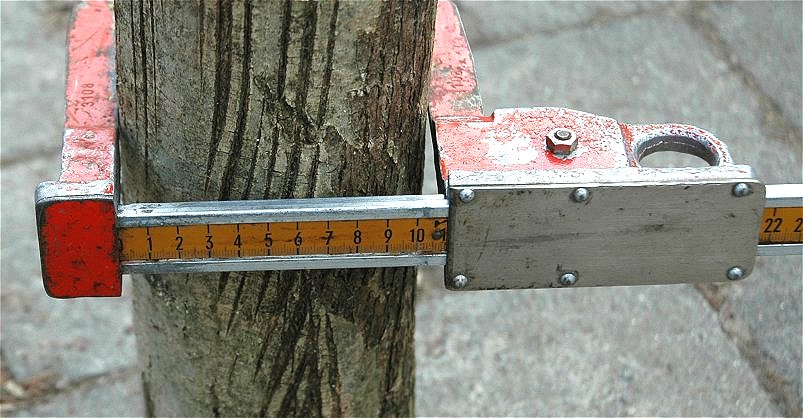

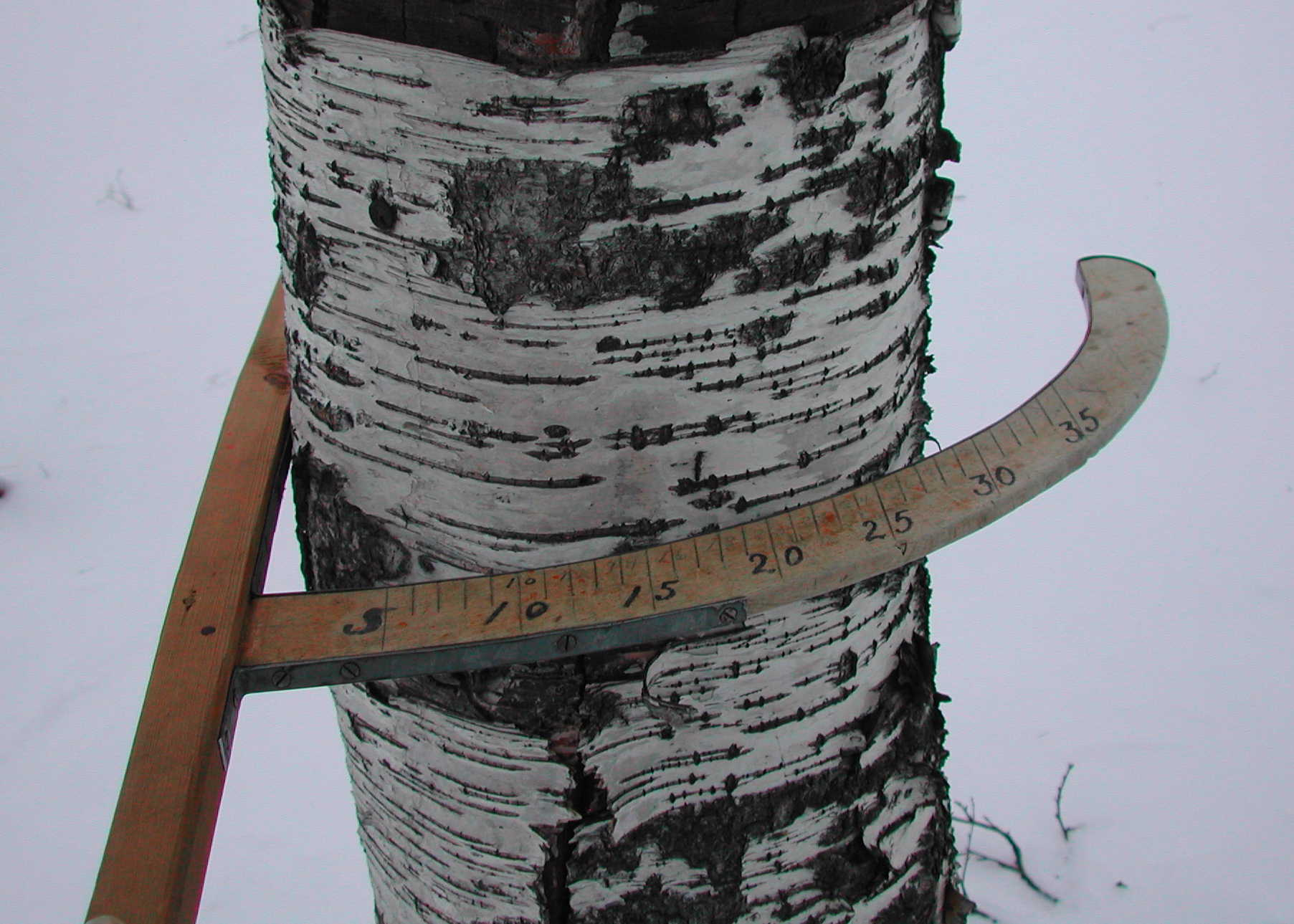

A tree caliper is a tool to measure the diameter of a tree. When used in forestry, the tree caliper tool measures the DBH or "diameter at breast height" of a tree that is growing in a landscape of any kind. The measurement is generally made at 4.5' or 1.4m above the soil.

Caliper measurements on nursery stock trees describe the size of the plant material being sold. The caliper measurement for nursery stock trees measuring four inches or less is taken six inches above the soil. Once a nursery stock tree's caliper exceeds four inches, the tree is measured twelve inches above the soil.

There are a considerable number of designs of the tool.
