= Field-Map =

Toll for programmatic field data collection

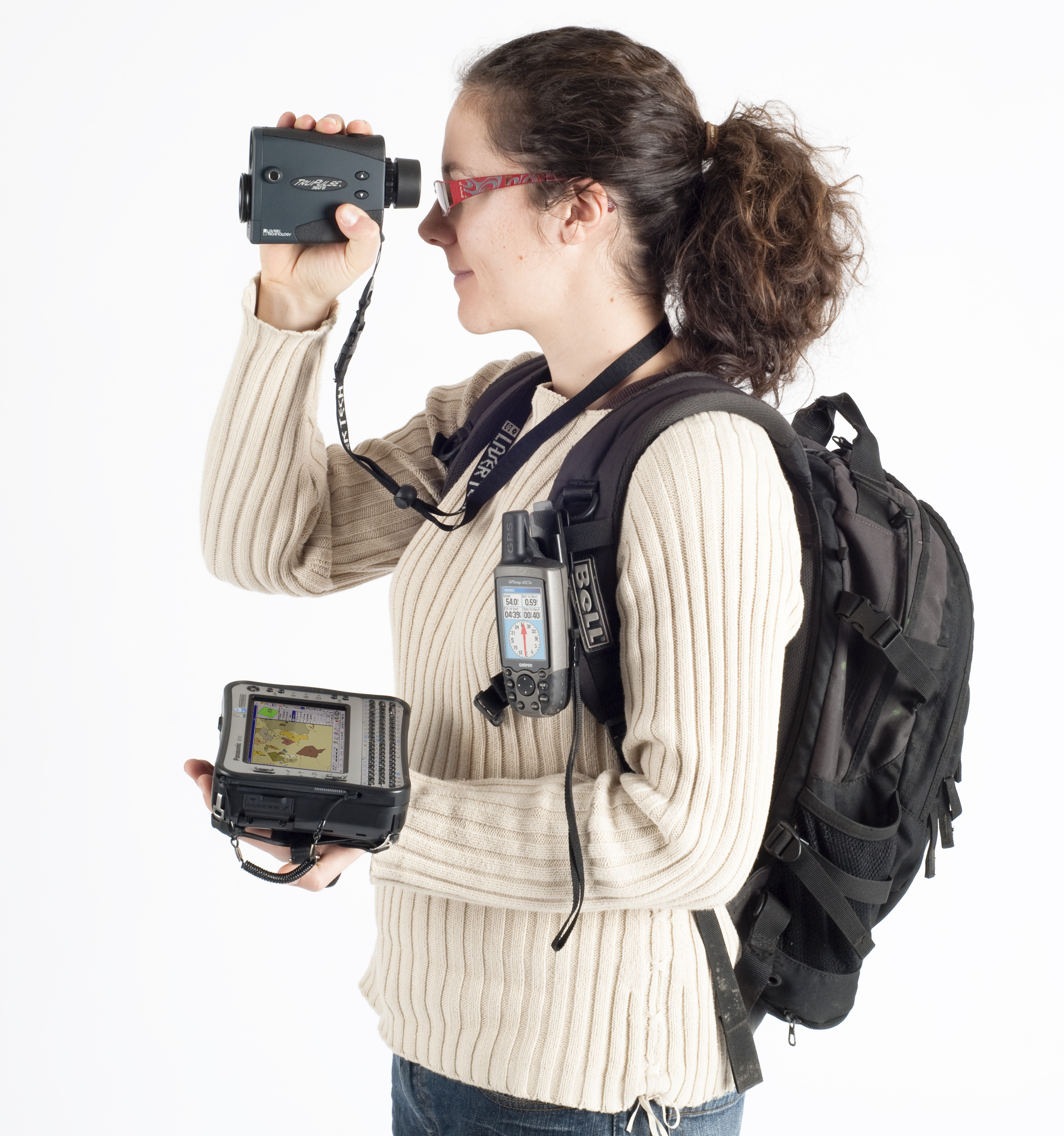
Example of instruments used for conducting forest inventories (rugged laptop, GPS and laser rangefinder).

Field-Map is a proprietary integrated tool designed for programmatic field data collection from IFER – Monitoring and Mapping Solutions, Ltd.

It is mainly used for the allocation of forest ecosystems and data collection during field analysis. This application is able to work with relational databases, and provides seamless communication with external devices such as GPS, laser rangefinders and for national forest inventories in Ireland, Cape Verde, Czech Republic, Belgium, Slovakia, Hungary and Russia
