= Marking axe =

Forestry tool

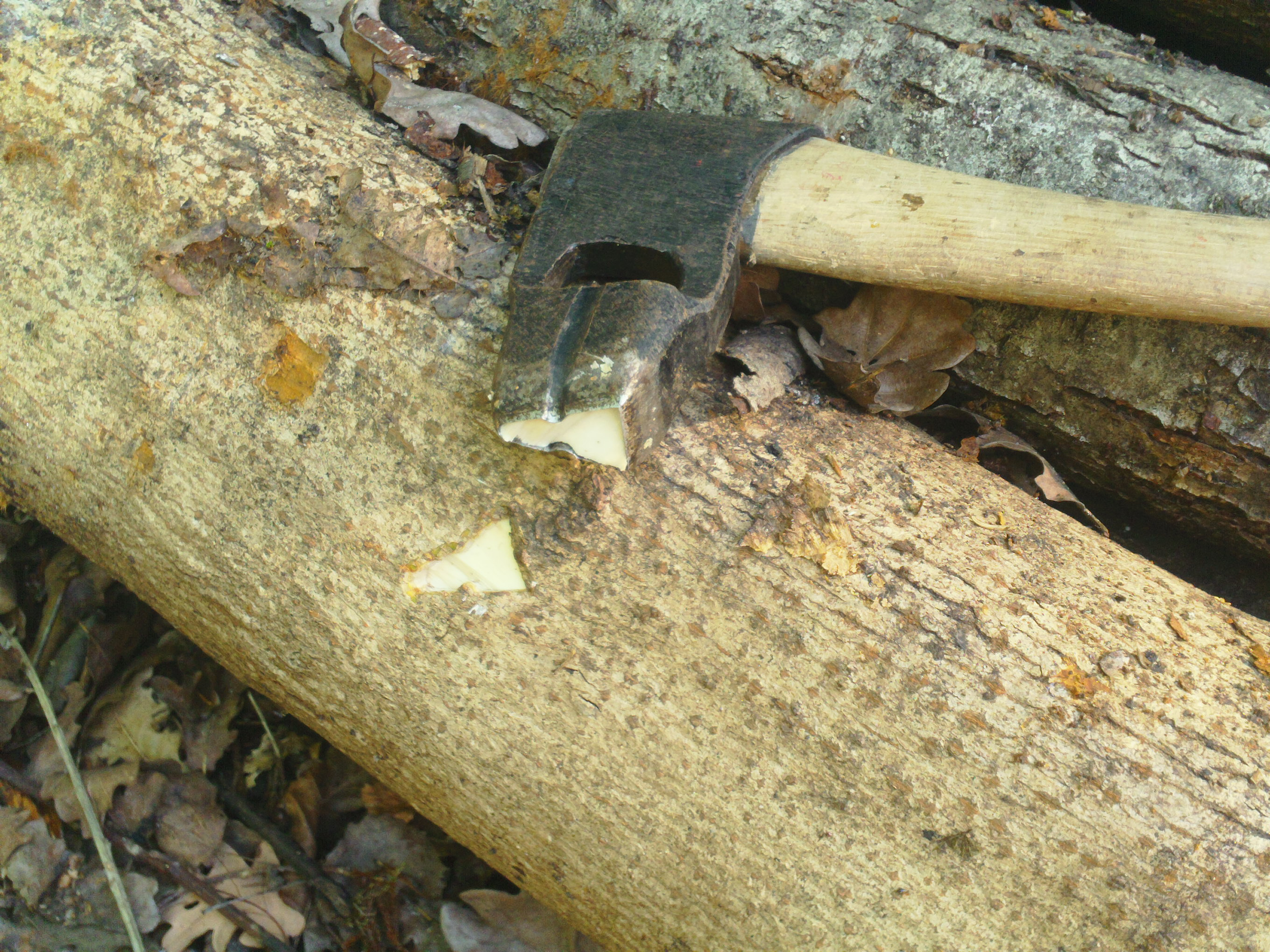
A Norwegian timber marking axe from the 1960s.

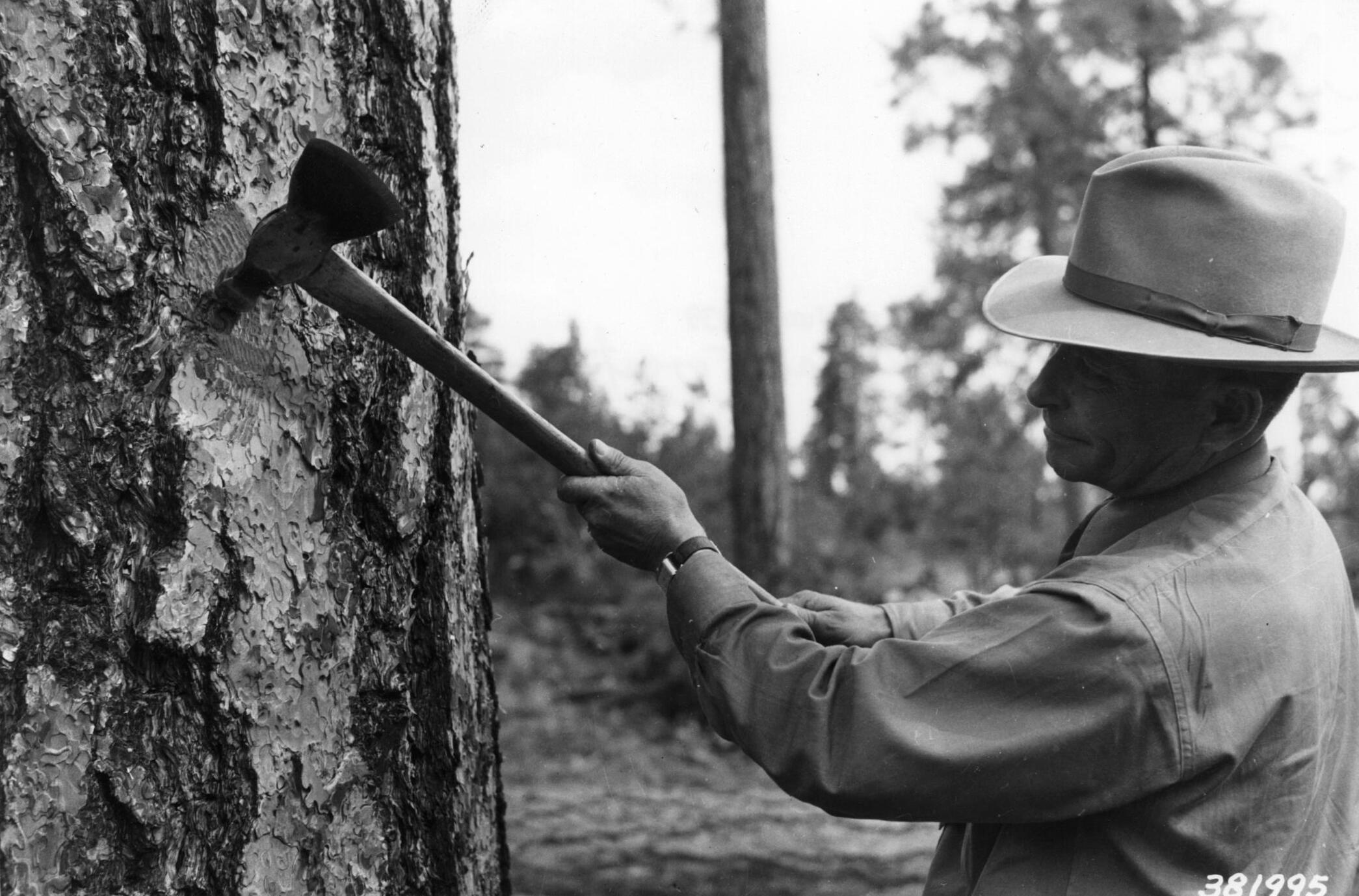
A marking axe being used by a forestry officer

A marking axe or marking hatchet is a small hatchet which was used by forest workers to mark trees designated for logging or for thinning. These axes were used also for trail blazing or for marking the ends of the felled logs for identification of the owner (stamping axe).

== Usage ==
A hole in the bark was first cut with the axe side of the head. Then the hammer side was hit on the spot, and a raised die on the hammer would create a stamp of the mark. The hammer would create a recognizable marking to show the owner or buyer of the tree. After marking all the trees on a stand, it would be ready for cutting. Felled logs could be marked also with a log marking hammer which was used on the end of the logs. Nowadays the marks on standing trees are done usually with paint.
