= Tree allometry =

Quantitative relations between some key characteristic dimensions of trees

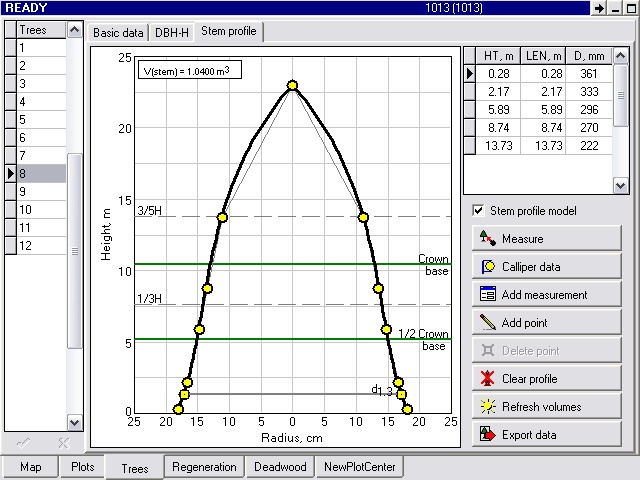
Stem profile measurement Electronic equipment (as Field-Map for example) is used for stem profile measurements and for measurements of profiles/projections of the crown. These key measurements are used for estimation of carbon sequestered in the plants.

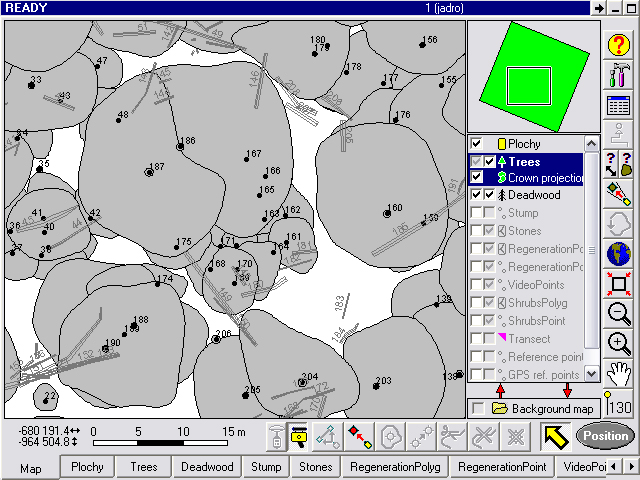
Forest structure measurement is needed for establishment of allometric equations.

Tree allometry establishes quantitative relations between some key characteristic dimensions of trees (usually fairly easy to measure) and other properties (often more difficult to assess). To the extent these statistical relations, established on the basis of detailed measurements on a small sample of typical trees, hold for other individuals, they permit extrapolations and estimations of a host of dendrometric quantities on the basis of a single (or at most a few) measurements.

The study of allometry is extremely important in dealing with measurements and data analysis in the practice of forestry. Allometry studies the relative size of organs or parts of organisms. Tree allometry narrows the definition to applications involving measurements of the growth or size of trees. Allometric relationships often are used to estimate difficult tree measurements, such as volume, from an easily measured attribute such as diameter at breast height (DBH).

The use of allometry is widespread in forestry and forest ecology. In order to develop an allometric relationship there must be a strong relationship and an ability to quantify this relationship between the parts of the subject measured and the other quantities of interest. Also when developing this equation one must play in factors which affect tree growth such as age, species, site location, etc. Once all these guidelines are met, one may attempt to develop an allometric equation.

== Assessment of forest biomass and carbon stocks ==
In 2013, the Food and Agriculture Organization of the United Nations launched GlobAllomeTree, a web-based platform designed to improve global access to tree allometric equations and support forest and climate-change project developers, researchers, scientists and foresters to assess forest volume and biomass, and carbon stocks. Jointly developed by FAO, the French Research Centre CIRAD and Tuscia University of Italy, the GlobAllomeTree platform provides a consistent and harmonized database of tree and stand volume and biomass allometric equations; software to compare equations and assess variables of interests, such as volume, biomass and carbon stocks; access to scientific research information on allometric equations; and access to tutorials, manuals and documentation supporting the development and use of tree allometric equations.

In 2012, FAO and CIRAD published a manual for building tree volume and biomass allometric equations for students, technicians or researchers working to assess forest resources such as volume, biomass and carbon stocks for commercial, bioenergy or climate change mitigation purposes.

== Methodology ==
First thing to do is select a group of some subject (for forestry: trees). Then measure several easily measured attributes such as DBH, height, species, etc. Graph the results and perform a regression analysis and transform some of the variables until a correct regression is found.

There are different tree species compositions in each region in the world and most of those regions have at least one equation that estimates tree volume from DBH. Research and the application of forest allometry have meshed over time to develop these quick equations to accurately estimate how much volume a particular forest stand holds.

The general allometric equation for mathematics and science is

$$Y = \beta X^\alpha$$

where Y is a biological variable (such as tree height or DBH), β is a proportionality coefficient, α is the scaling exponent (which is equal to the slope of the line when plotted on logarithmic coordinates), and X is some physical measure such as body volume or body mass(M). While α is often quite similar between very diverse organisms, β differs from species to species. Because the proportionality constants β and the scaling exponents α are often denoted using Greek letters, it is desirable to use β as the proportionality coefficient versus α, since α could be misread as the symbol for "proportional".

A well-known allometric equation relates metabolic rate to body mass: Y = βM 3/4.

In forestry the equation takes on many forms in order to represent relationships between the many various attributes of tree size and growth. Below is an example:

$$Y = b_0 + b_1 X$$

== See also ==
- Biomass allocation
- da Vinci branching rule
