= Kfar Devora =

Archaeological site in the Golan Heights

Kfar Dvora
- כפר דבורה (Hebrew)
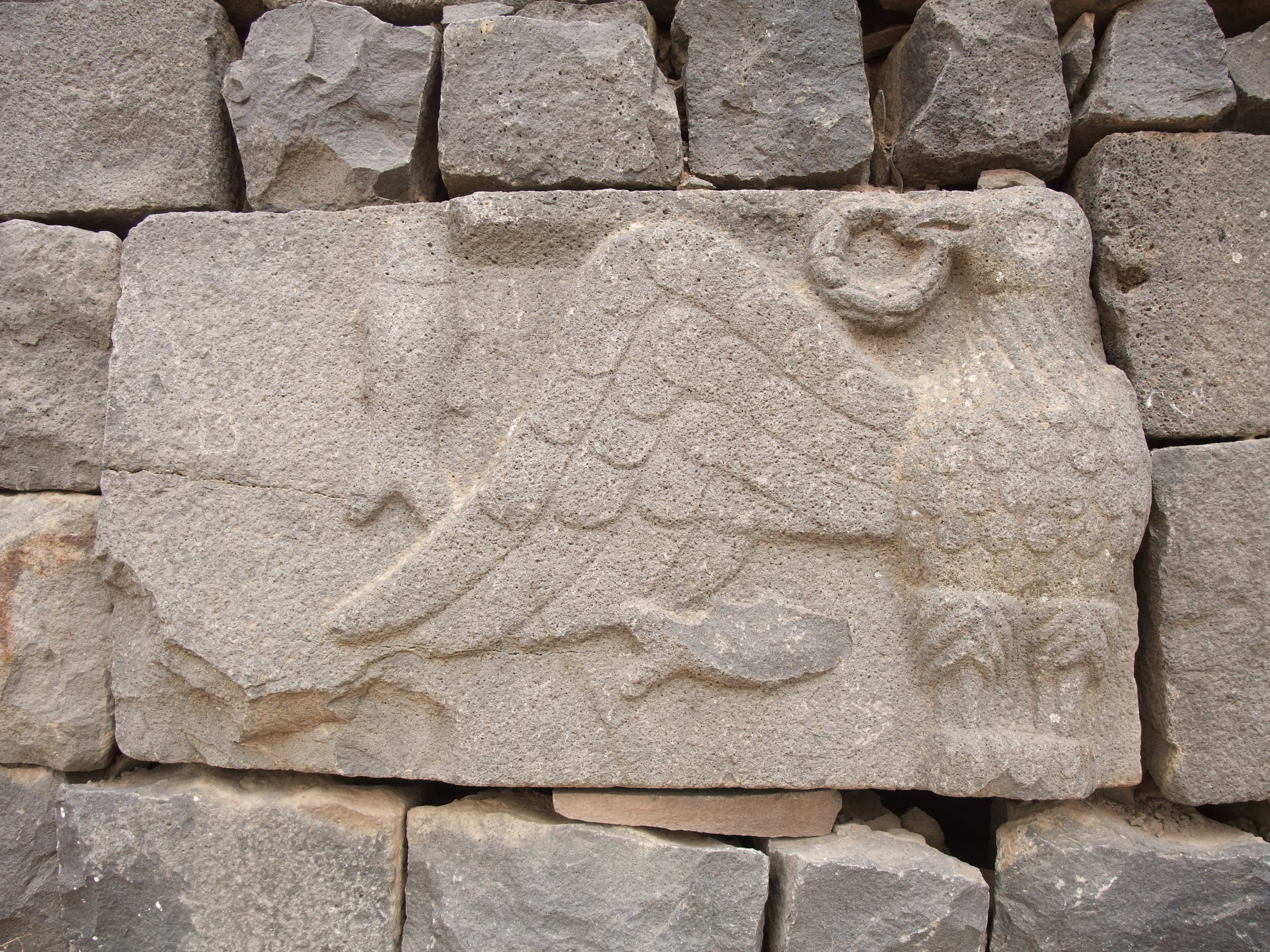
- Interactive map of Kfar Dvora
- Type: Settlement; Ancient synagogue; Archaeological site
- Periods: Bronze Age, Iron Age, Hellenistic period, Roman period, Byzantine period
- Cultures: Jewish
- Location: Kidmat Tzvi, Golan Heights, Syria

History
- Built: c. 1st century BCE
- Abandoned: c. 1st century CE

Site notes
- Height: 683 m (2,241 ft)
- Area: 2 ha (4.9 acres)
- Condition: Ruined
- Owner: Public
- Public access: Yes

Kfar Dvora (Hebrew: כפר דבורה) was a Jewish settlement during the Talmudic period in the upper Gilbon River region, and now archaeological site, located in the Golan Heights, in Syria. On the ruins of Kfar Dvora, the Syrian village of Daburiya was established, which is currently abandoned. Before the Six-Day War, the village was inhabited by Bedouins of the Na'arna tribe, who made secondary use of the stones from the ancient Jewish settlement for construction purposes. The village is currently located northwest of the settlement of Kidmat Tzvi.

== History ==
In the village, archaeological remains have been found indicating a thriving settlement during the Mishnaic and Talmudic periods, including remains of olive oil press facilities, which were likely the village's main economic activity and contributed to its wealth. One of the important findings in the village is a unique lintel decorated with two birds of prey holding a wreath in their beaks, with the inscription:

”זה בית מדרשו שהלרבי [= של רבי] אליעזר הקפר”.

The inscription refers to Eleazar ha-Kappar, a Tanna of the fifth generation, who was active in Katzrin and its surroundings. The lintel is currently located in the Golan Archaeological Museum in Katzrin. The lintel stone found embedded in one of the house walls Another lintel stone was found embedded in the walls of one of the houses. It is about a meter long and is decorated with an eagle holding a wreath in its beak and two fish beside it. It is possible that this lintel adorned the village's synagogue.

In October 2018, a hiding complex was documented within the boundaries of the Kfar Dvora. The complex is dated to the first century BCE, with its use continuing until the first century CE.

== Gallery ==
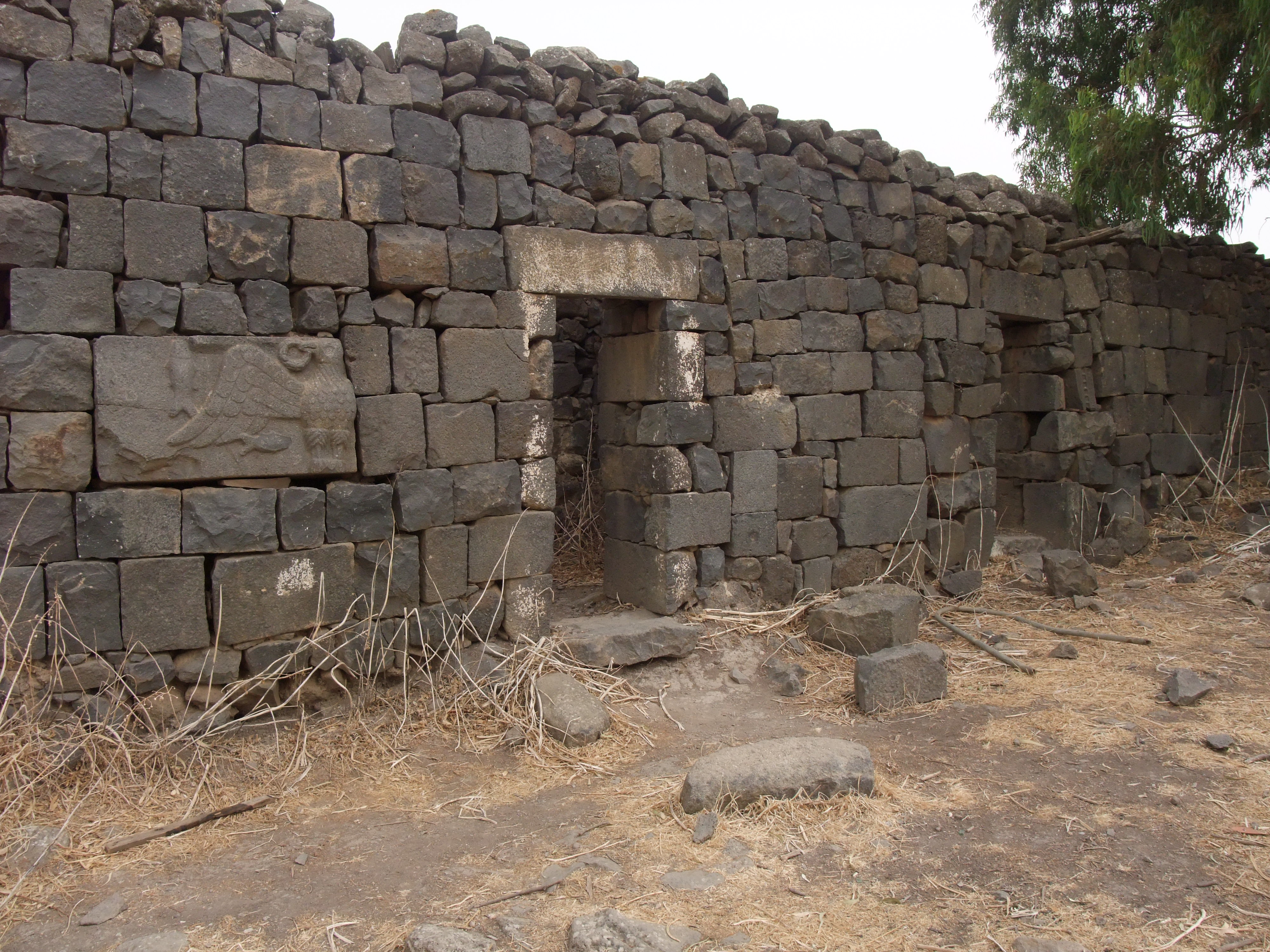

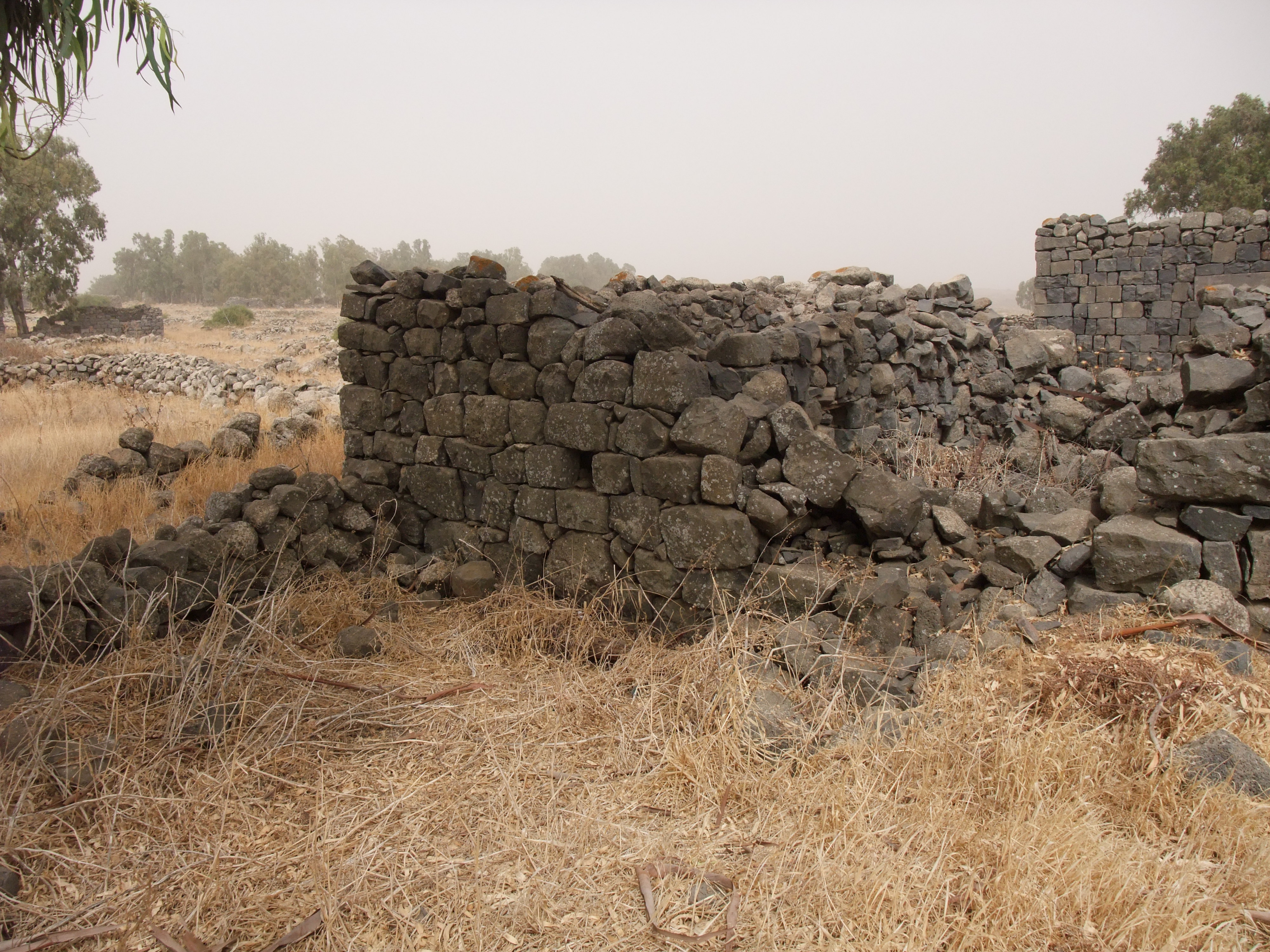

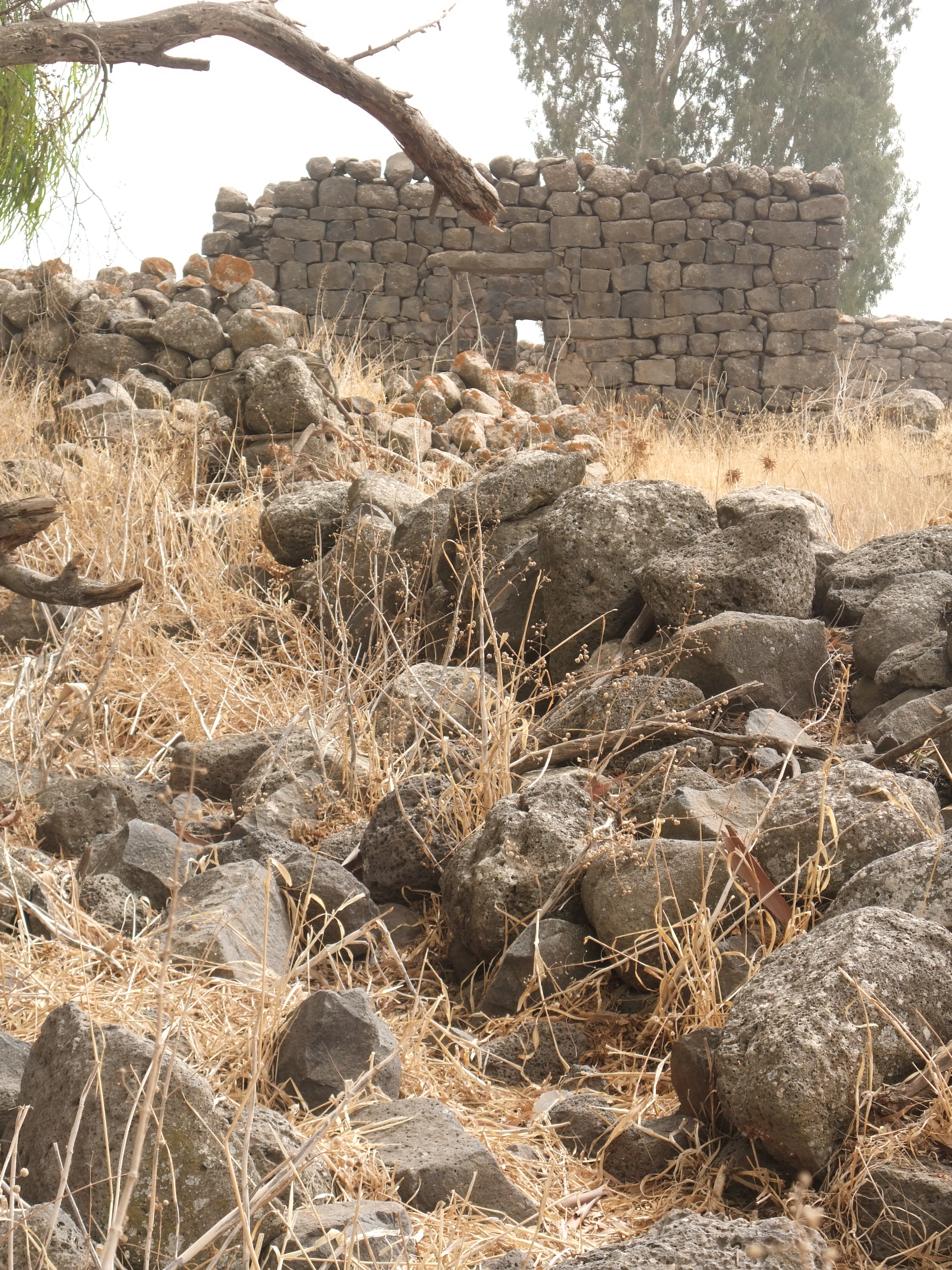

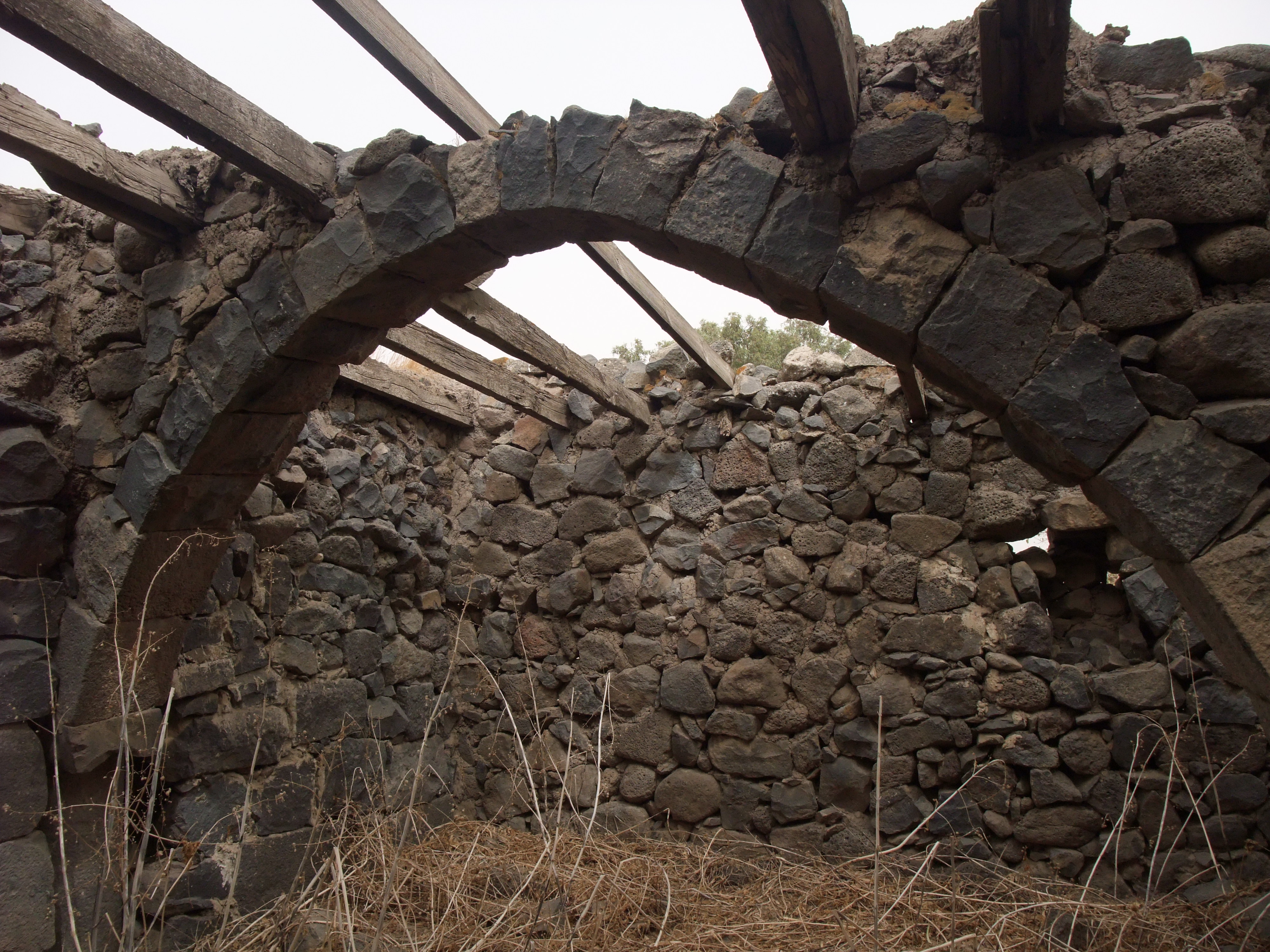
