= National Alternative Fuels Training Consortium =

American alternative fuel training organization

- Abbreviation: NAFTC
- Formation: 1992
- Founder: West Virginia University
- Type: Non-profit educational organization
- Headquarters: Morgantown, West Virginia, U.S.
- Region served: United States
- Members: Over 50 National and Associate Training Centers
- Executive Director: Mark Fullen
- Parent organization: West Virginia University
- Website: naftc.wvu.edu

National Alternative Fuels Training Consortium (NAFTC) is an American national training organization with its headquarters located in Morgantown, West Virginia. NAFTC is a West Virginia University program founded in 1992. Its objective is to decrease the United States' dependence on foreign oil and improve air quality through the use of advanced technology vehicles and alternative fuels.

== Overview ==
National Alternative Fuels Training Consortium's training programs include online training through NAFTC's Learning Management System, classroom training, and use of companion guides, like iPhone/Android apps or quick reference guides. Content developed by NAFTC is used by about 50 National and Associate Training Centers. Information is conveyed to local communities through material developed in partnership with high schools, community colleges, and universities.

NAFTC has held National Alternative Fuel Vehicle Day Odyssey events since 2002 to provide greater public awareness of advanced technology vehicles and alternative fuels, such as biodiesel, hydrogen, natural gas, propane, electricity, and ethanol. National Park Service, U.S. Department of Energy Clean Cities Program, Greater Washington Region Clean Cities Coalition, AmeriCorps National Civilian Community Corps, and Smithsonian Institution were the national partners for the 2014 event held in Washington, D.C. The event was sponsored by American Honda Motor Company and the Propane Education and Research Council.

The 2017 date for National Alternative Fuel Vehicle Day Odyssey was April 20.

== Awards ==
- 2012 – Automotive Training Manager's Council's National Excellence in Training Award for Electric Drive Vehicle First Responder Safety Training
- 2007 – Automotive Training Manager's Council's National Excellence in Training Award for Overview of Biodiesel Training

== See also ==
- EPA Sustainability
- Greenhouse gas emissions by the United States
