= Pulp and paper industry =

Industry involved in manufacture of paper and paperboard

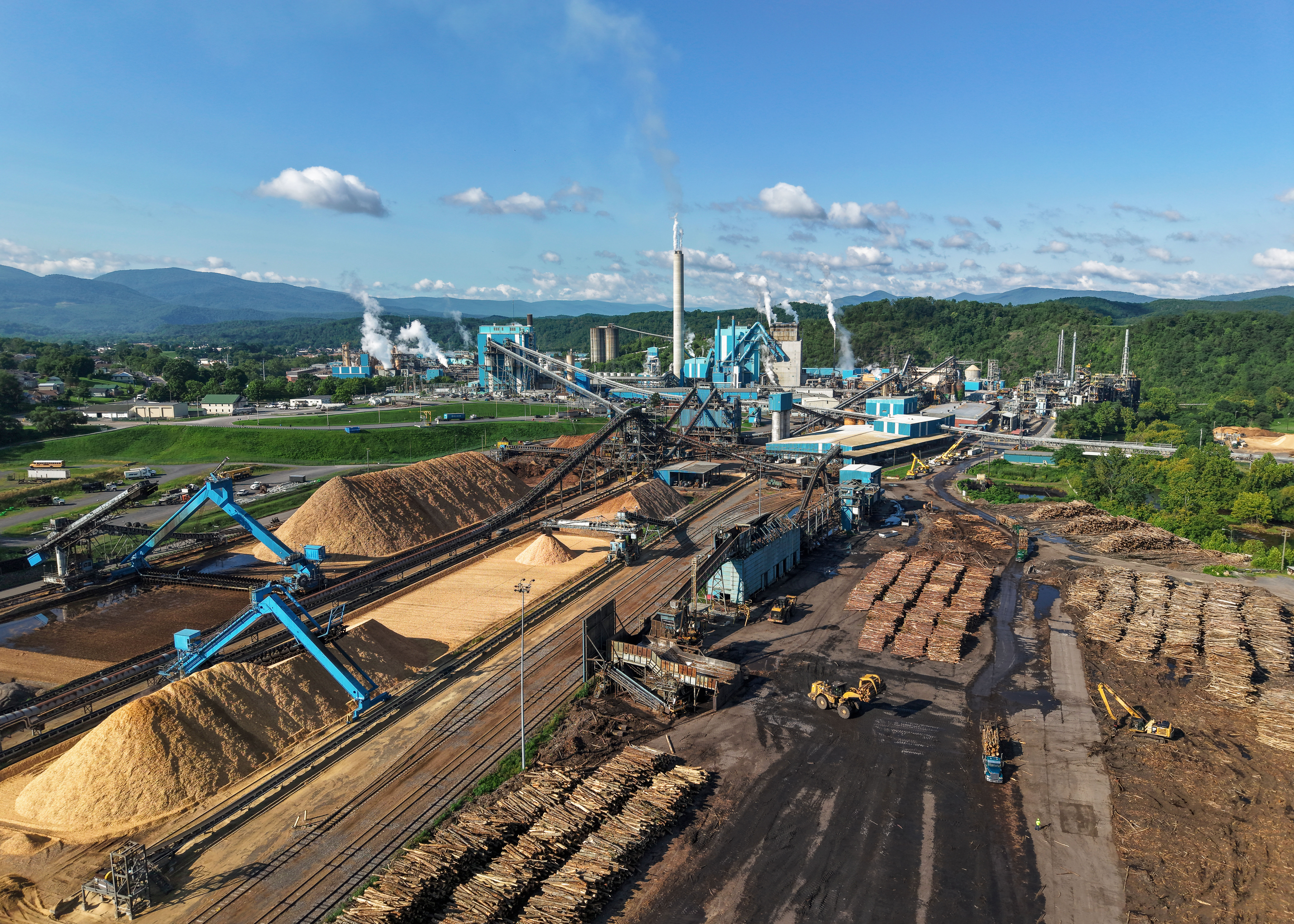
Smurfit Westrock is the world's largest pulp and paper maker.

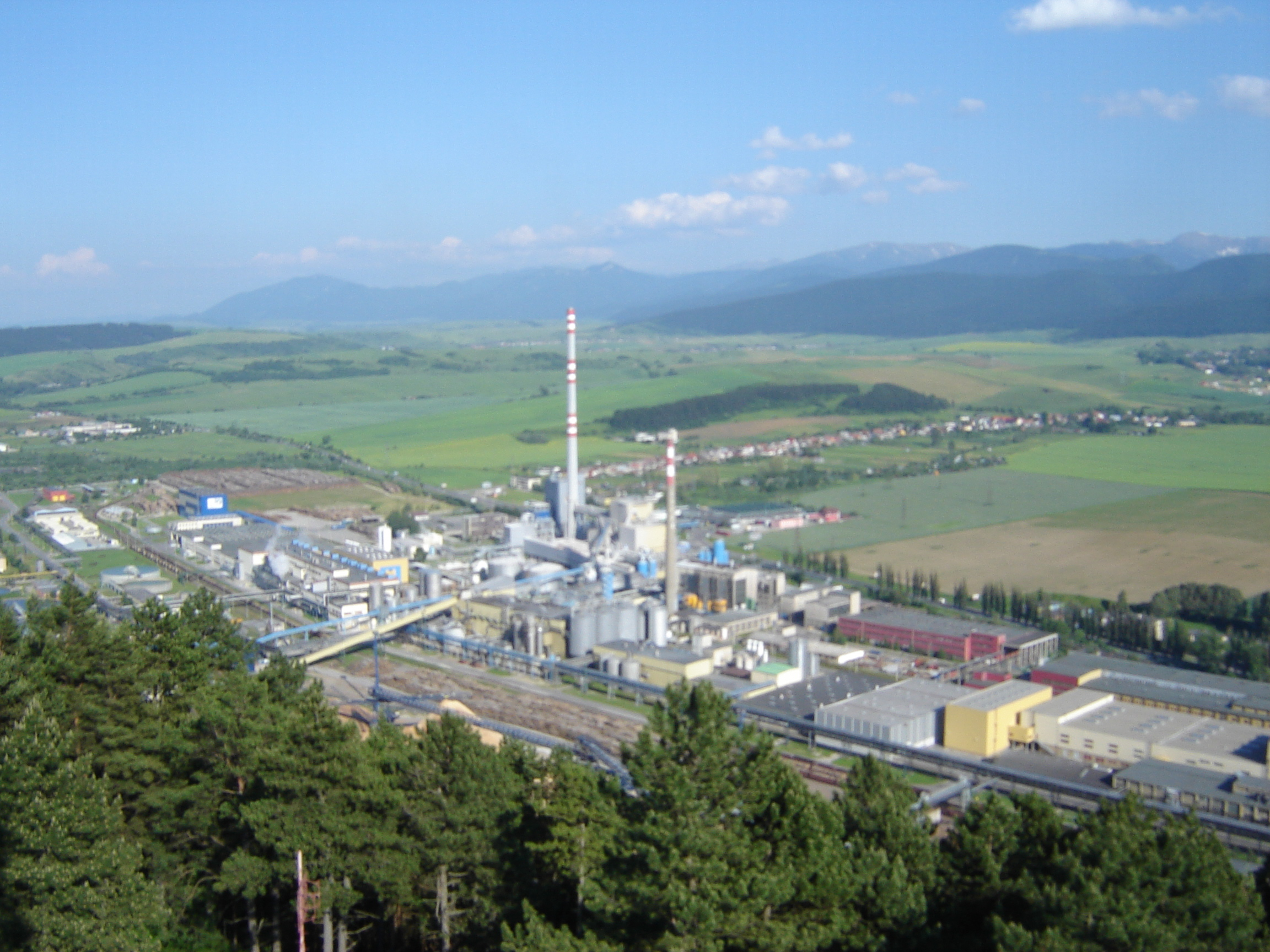
Paper mill Mondi SCP in Slovakia

The pulp and paper industry comprises companies that use wood, specifically pulpwood, as raw material and produce pulp, paper, paperboard, and other cellulose-based products.

Diagram showing the sections of the Fourdrinier machine

== Manufacturing process ==
In the manufacturing process, pulp is introduced into a paper machine where it is shaped into a paper web and water is extracted through pressing and drying stages.

Pressing involves removing water from the sheet by applying force. This process employs a specialized type of felt, distinct from traditional felt, to absorb the water. In contrast, hand-made paper uses a blotter sheet for this purpose. Drying involves eliminating water from the paper sheets through air or heat. Historically, this was achieved by hanging the sheets to dry, similar to laundry. In modern papermaking, various heated drying mechanisms are employed, with the steam-heated can dryer being the most prevalent on paper machines.

== History ==
Papermaking as a craft is ancient, and for centuries it used various fibers, mainly grasses (cereal straws and others), or rags from old clothing made from them, in various preindustrial times and places. The commercial planting of domesticated mulberry trees to make pulp for papermaking is attested as early as the 6th century. Due to advances in printing technology, the Chinese paper industry continued to grow under the Song dynasty to meet the rising demand for printed books. Demand for paper was also stimulated by the Song government, which needed a large supply of paper to print paper money and exchange certificates.

An example of an enterprising paper mill during the late phase of the preindustrial era is the mill by William Rittenhouse and sons at what is now preserved as Historic Rittenhouse Town in Pennsylvania.

The first mechanized paper machine was installed at Frogmore Paper Mill, Apsley, Hertfordshire in 1803, followed by another in 1804. The site operates currently as a museum.

During the 19th and 20th centuries, the paper chemical technologies for making the pulp from wood rather than grasses underwent some major industrial-era upgrades, as first the soda pulping process and then the Kraft process helped reduce the unit cost of paper manufacture. This made paper newly abundant, and along with continual advancements in printing press technologies, as well as in transport technologies (for distribution), during these same centuries, led to greatly increased sales and circulation of newspapers, other periodicals, and books of every kind.

== Environmental effects ==
The pulp and paper industry has been criticized by environmental groups like the Natural Resources Defense Council for unsustainable deforestation and clearcutting of old-growth forest. The industry trend is to expand globally to countries like Russia, China and Indonesia with low wages and low environmental oversight. According to Greenpeace, farmers in Central America illegally rip up vast tracts of native forest for cattle and soybean production without any consequences, and companies who buy timber from private land owners contribute to massive deforestation of the Amazon Rainforest. On the other hand, the situation is quite different where forest growth has been on the increase for a number of years. It is estimated for instance that since 1990 forests have grown in Europe by 17 million hectares, which has been supported through the practice of sustainable forest management by the industry. In Sweden, for every tree that is felled, two are planted.

The pulp and paper industry consumes a significant amount of water and energy and produces wastewater with a high concentration of chemical oxygen demand (COD), among other contaminants. Recent studies underline coagulation as an appropriate pre-treatment of pulp and paper industrial wastewater and as a cost-effective solution for the removal of COD and the reduction of pressures on the aquatic environment.

== Current production volumes and sales ==
The industry is dominated by North American (United States and Canada), northern European (Finland, Sweden, and North-West Russia) and East Asian countries (such as East Siberian Russia, China, Japan, and South Korea). Australasia and Brazil also have significant pulp and paper enterprises. The industry also has a significant presence in a number of European countries including Germany, Portugal, Italy, the Netherlands and Poland. The United States had been the world's leading producer of paper until it was overtaken by China in 2009.

=== List of main countries by production quantity ===
According to data from Statista, China produced 110 million metric tons in 2018 followed by the US with 72 million.

According to statistic data by RISI, main producing countries of paper and paperboard, not including pulp, in the world are as follows:

Rank 2011	Country	Production in 2011 (1,000 ton)	Share (2011)	Rank (2010)	Production in 2010 (1,000 ton)
1	China	99,300	24.9%	1	92,599
2	United States	75,083	18.8%	2	75,849
3	Japan	26,627	6.7%	3	27,288
4	Germany	22,698	5.7%	4	23,122
5	Canada	12,112	3.0%	5	12,787
6	South Korea	11,492	2.9%	8	11,120
7	Finland	11,329	2.8%	6	11,789
8	Sweden	11,298	2.8%	7	11,410
9	Brazil	10,159	2.5%	10	9,796
10	Indonesia	10,035	2.5%	9	9,951
	World Total	398,975	100.0%		394,244

=== List of main company groups by production quantity ===
The world's main paper and paperboard company groups are as follows. (Some figures are estimates.):

Rank	Company group	Country	Production in 2015 (1,000 ton)	Rank by sales
1	International Paper	United States	23,315	1
2	Nine Dragon Paper Holdings	China	12,630	2
3	WestRock	United States	12,487	4
4	UPM	Finland	9,771	5
5	Stora Enso	Finland	9,188	8
6	Oji Paper Company	Japan	9,115	3
7	Sappi	South Africa	7,306	15
8	Smurfit Kappa	Ireland	7,000	9
9	DS Smith	United Kingdom	6,802	13
10	Nippon Paper	Japan	6,542	11

=== List by net sales ===
In 2008, the top 10 forest, paper and packaging products companies were, according to a report by PricewaterhouseCoopers:

Rank	Company	Country	2008 net sales (US$M)	2008 net income (loss) (US$M)
1	International Paper	United States	24,829	(1,282)
2	Kimberly-Clark	United States	19,415	1,690
3	SCA	Sweden	16,965 (SEK)	857
4	Stora Enso	Finland	16,227	(991)
5	UPM	Finland	13,920	(263)
6	Oji Paper	Japan	12,788	114
7	Nippon Unipac	Japan	11,753	55
8	Smurfit Kappa	Ireland	10,390	(73)
9	Metsä Group	Finland	9,335	(313)
10	Mondi	UK/South Africa	9,466	(310)

== Manufacturers and suppliers for the industry ==
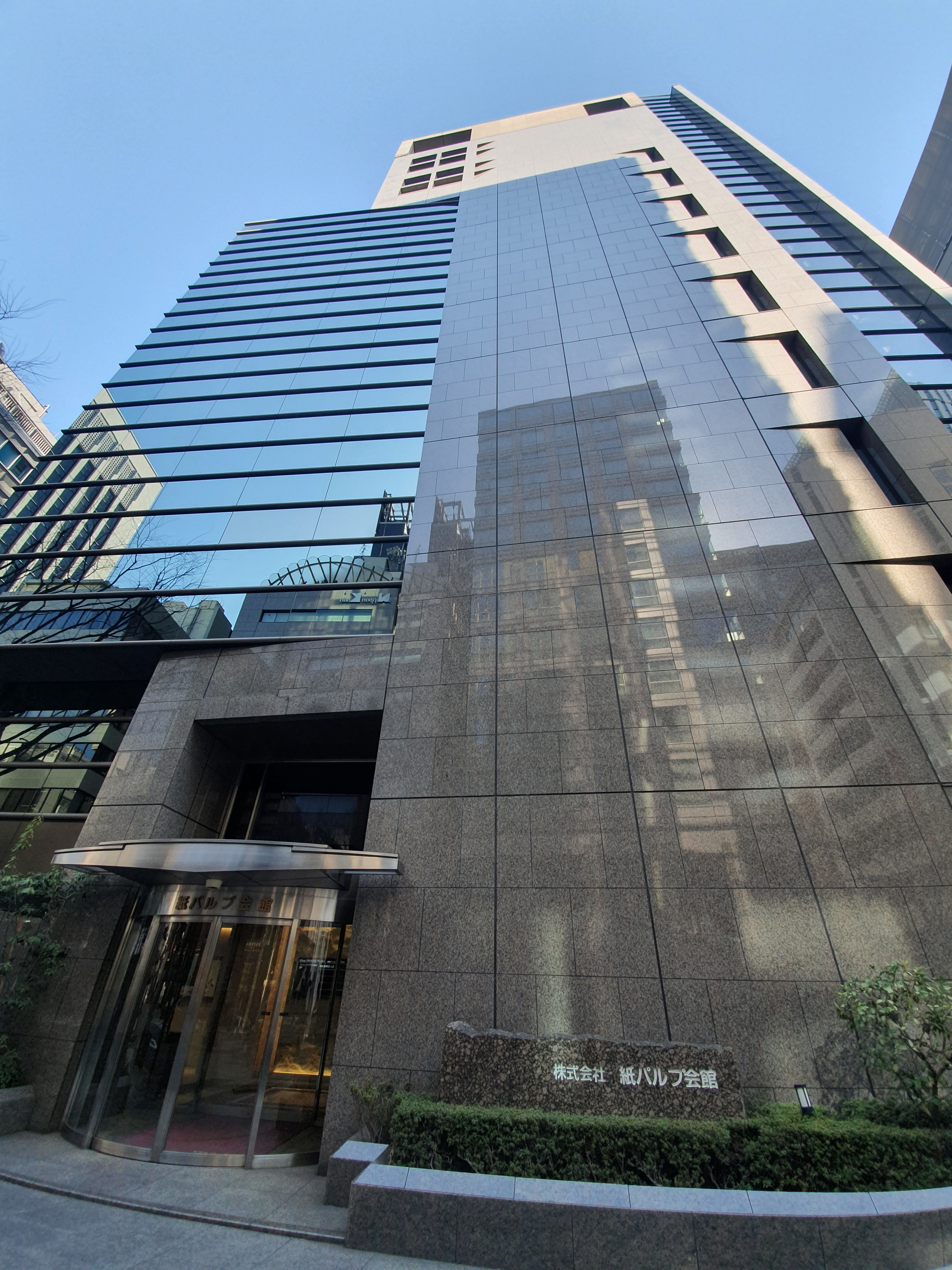
Pulp & Paper Building, in Japan. It hosts many organizations in the pulp and paper industry.

Leading manufacturers of capital equipment with over $1 billion in annual revenue for the pulp and paper industry include:

- Valmet
- Bellmer
- Andritz
- Metso
- Voith
- Parason Machinery
- Scan Machineries
- Kadant
- Statiflo

== See also ==
- American Forest & Paper Association
- List of paper mills
- Converters (industry)
- Pulp and paper industry in Canada
- Pulp and paper industry in Europe
- Confederation of European Paper Industries
- Pulp and paper industry in Japan
- Pulp and paper industry in the United States
- Roll hardness tester
- Wood industry
- Forestry industry

== Sources ==
- Needham, Joseph; Tsuen-Hsuin, Tsien (1985). Paper and Printing. Science and Civilisation in China. Cambridge University Press. ISBN 978-0-521-08690-5.
