= Per Ankre =

Norwegian handball player (born 1948)

Per Axel Ankre (born 4 August 1948) is a retired Norwegian handball player who competed in the 1972 Summer Olympics.

He was born in Oslo, has a Master of Science in Economics and Business Administration and represented the club SK Arild. In 1972 he was part of the Norwegian team which finished ninth in the Olympic tournament. He played all five matches and scored ten goals. After the olympics in 1972 he played professional for Atletico de Madrid until 1975. From 1975 till 1983 he worked with Scandinavian Bulk Traders AS. Scanfiber AS in 1983, a trading company within the forestry industry. Scanfiber AS is importing wood rawmaterial for the Pulp and paper industry in Europe from overseas sources including trading of pulpwood inside Europe. Per Axel Ankre is married to Maria Katharina Schenk and have 2 sons from a previous marriage.
