= Bellmer =

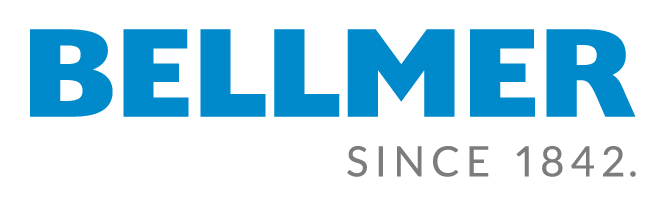
Logo of Bellmer GmbH

Bellmer GmbH is a company founded in 1842 in Niefern-Öschelbronn, Germany by Carl Bellmer. It is still family-owned with over 600 employees globally. Bellmer operates 16 sites around the world but the products are manufactured in Germany and Finland.

There are two different fields in which Bellmer operates. The first part is the manufacturing of paper machines and the second one is separation technology. Those machines are used for thickening or dewatering of different suspensions.

== History ==
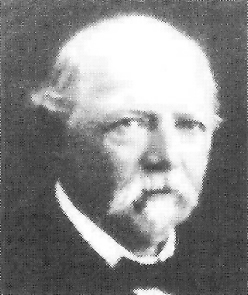
Carl Bellmer, the founder of Bellmer GmbH

It all began in 1842 when Carl Bellmer purchased a paper mill in Niefern. 12 paper machines had been produced up until 1862. In 1874 the two sons of Carl Bellmer, Emil and Karl Bellmer, continue the family business. A few years after that, Karl Bellmer remains the sole proprietor. In 1890 Bellmer began to export their machines.

The precursors of the WinklePress, the twin-wire press, was developed in 1928.

Ursula and Ulrich Kollmar continued to run the family business in 1957. Bellmer opens a new product range for themselves. In 1972 the first WinklePress for sludge dewatering was launched.

In 1994 the brothers Philipp, Martin and Erich Kollmar took over Bellmer and still run the company today. The Bruderhaus Company in Reutlingen was acquired in 1995. The same year in which the “new generation” of the WinklePress and TurboDrain Compact were developed. Three years later Bellmer acquired the Reinhard machine company known for their banknote paper machines. In this very year the award of the Confructa Prize went to Bellmer for innovations in the field of the fruit juice industry.

In 2001 the new shoe press, then-named TwinningPress, was launched. Bellmer founded their first subsidiary in Shanghai, China in 2003. In 2005 high-frequency shaking was made possible with the TurboShaker. The first zone-controlled TwinningPress is launched one year later. The first high-speed shaking unit TurboShaker was developed in 2007. In 2008 Lang-Hafner (Germany) was acquired and continued by Bellmer.

The acquisition and continuation of Bellmer Kufferath in Germany happened only one year later. In 2010 Bellmer Ibérica, which is located in Spain, was founded. Three years later Bellmer acquired Vaahto Paper Machinery Oy in Finland. In 2014 the new hydraulic TurboBladeJetter was launched. The Acquisition of GapCon (Germany) happened in 2015. In 2018 Bellmer USA was founded. Bellmer Italia was founded in 2019.

== Bio Economy ==
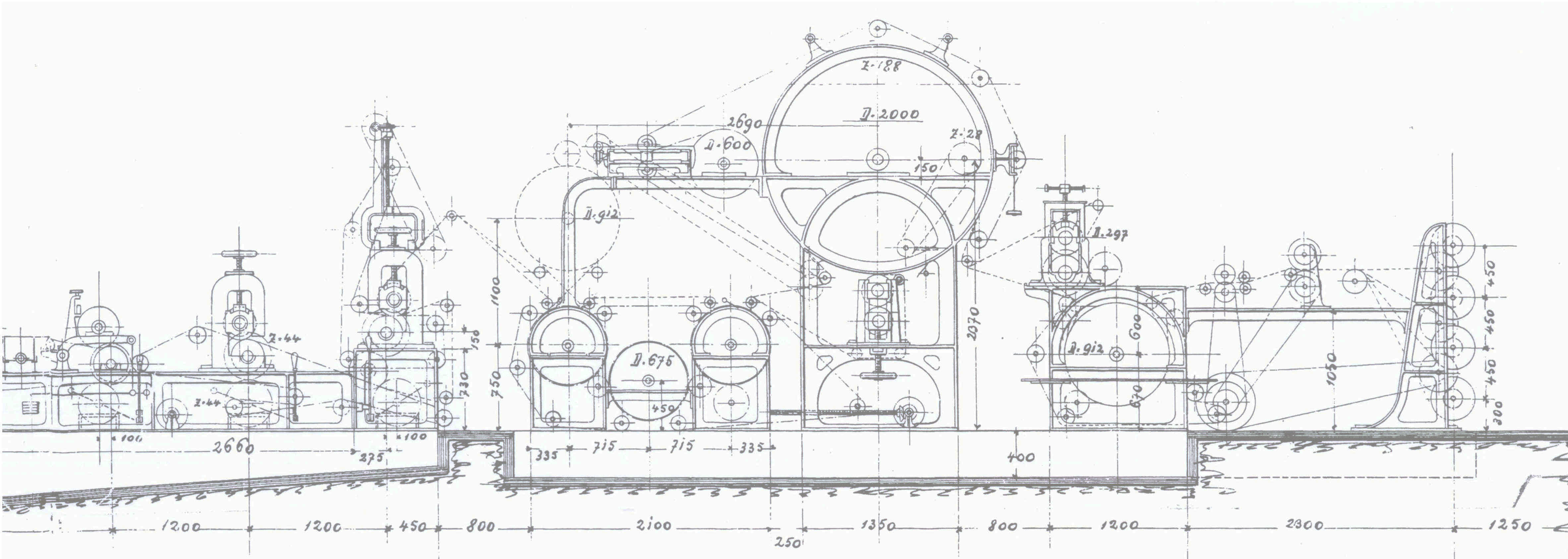
Bellmer old and handmade construction plan

Bellmer tries to minimize the environmental impact during the paper production process.

The separation technology products are designed to recycle waste while providing clean water – reducing the burden on the environment. Bellmer installs complete lines as well as single products for the production of paper, board or specialty fiber products. In the sector of Separation Technology, the focus lies on the efficient separation of liquids and solids.

== Paper Technology ==
Paper technology consists of planning and realizing plants and modernization projects for the pulp and paper industry. From the approach flow via the wire section, press part and drying section up to the pope reel and complete paper machines.

=== Products of Paper technology ===
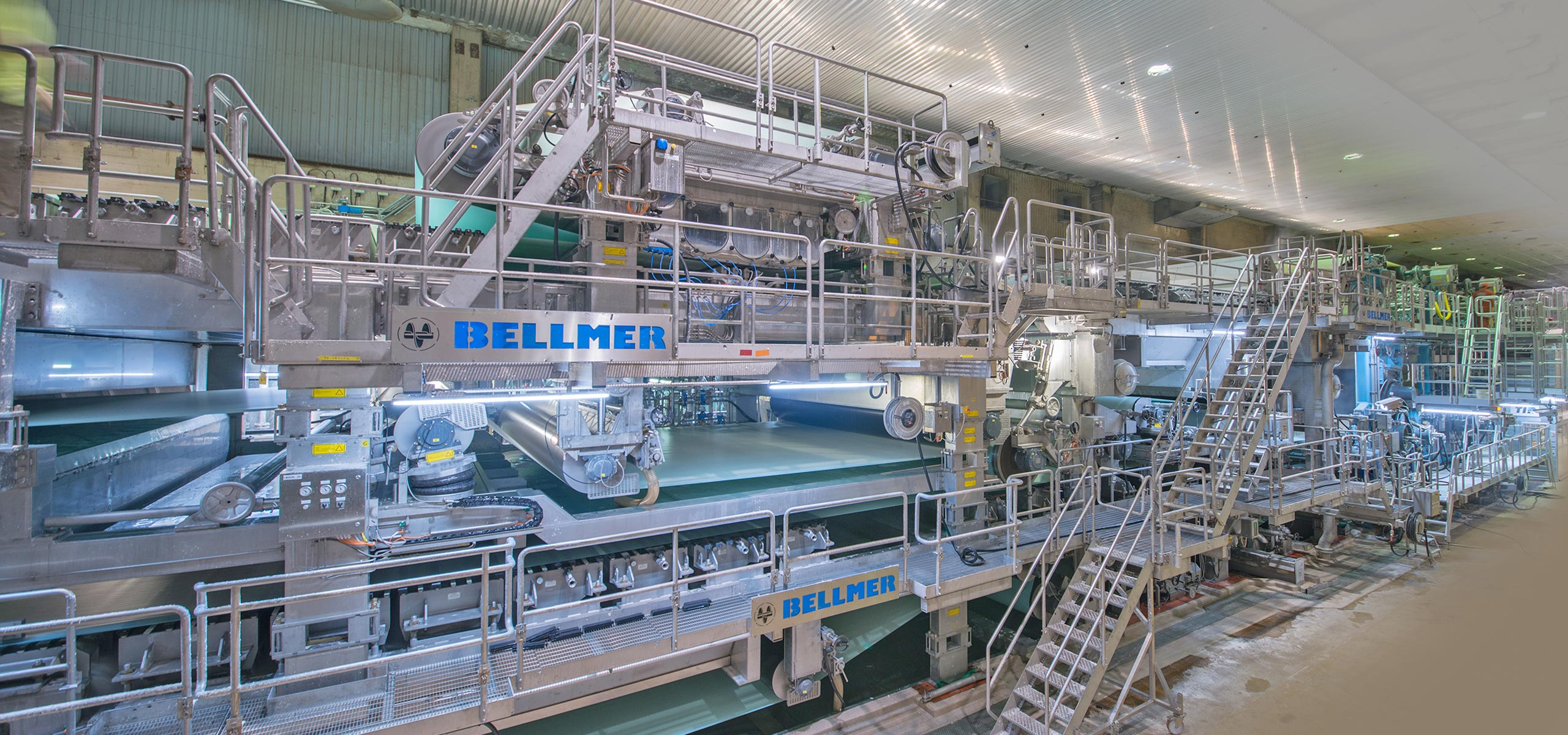
Bellmer Paper Technology - complete paper machine

==== TurboLine Products – Wet End ====
===== Headbox systems =====
- Hydraulic headbox - TurboJetter
- Recitifier Roll headbox - TurboStreamer
- Cylinder former - TurboFlower

===== Breast roll Shaker =====
It realigns fibers to homogenize sheet formation.

- Turboshaker

===== Wire Section =====
It enhances the formation and increase capacity in the forming section.

- Fourdrinier
- Hybrid Former
- Multiply Former

===== Press Section =====
It maximizes dryness and bulk on paper machines.

- Turbopress

==== TurboLine Products – Dry End ====
===== FilmPress =====
It ensures the quality for paper sizing or pre-coating.

- TurboFilmSizer

===== Calender =====
It maintains smoothness, caliper and bulk.

- TurboCalender

===== Curtain Coater =====
It applies a uniform coating to any paper product.

- Turbocoater & Curtain Coater

===== Winding and Reeling =====
- TurboReller
- Winder

== Separation Technology ==
Separation Technology treats thickening and dewatering of all sorts of suspensions for different industries, such as the municipal sector or the food industry. The aim is to provide the optimal separation of liquids and solids.

=== Thickening and Dewatering ===
==== Municipal ====
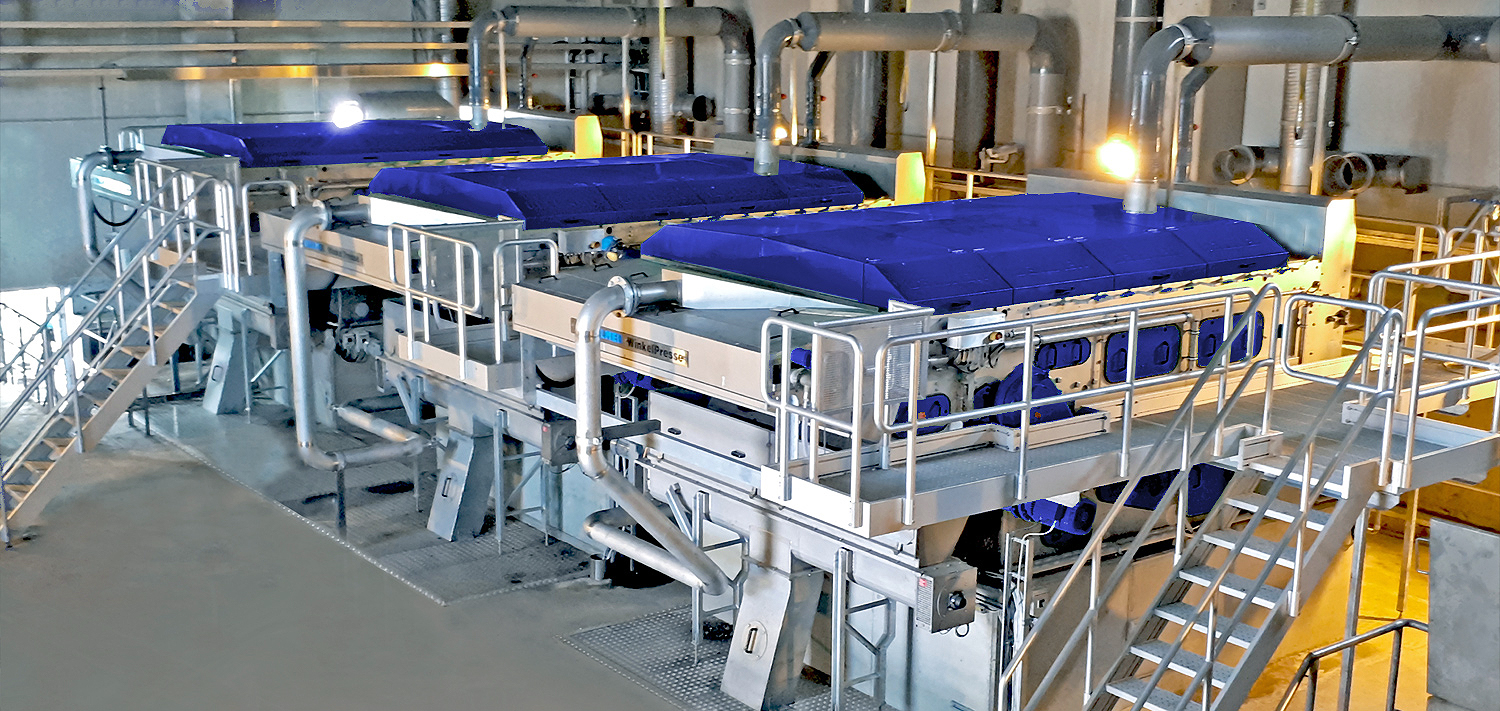
Bellmer Separation Technology - Belt Press WinklePress

In municipal waste water treatment, sludge dewatering and thickening is handled.

- Belt Thickener
- Belt Press
- Micro Filter
- Screw Press

==== Paper Industry ====
- Water Filtration – TurboDrain Recovery
- Thickening Process
- Dewatering Process – WinklePress
- Reject Handling

==== Fruit Juice and Food ====
Screens, mills and presses ensure fruit and vegetable juice production.

- Fruit Press - WinklePress
- Screw Press - AkuPress
- Sorting Table
- Elevator SD
- Hammer Mill - BAC
- Screen

==== Industry ====
- Lake and river sludge dewatering
- mobile dewatering
- drinking water preparation
- pharma and chemistry industry
- recycling
- Mining

==== Biogas ====
Equipment for fermentation of all types of biomass, like waste and renewable raw materials, is provided.

- Waste
- Wet Digester
- Dry Digester
