= Clean Cities Coalition Network =

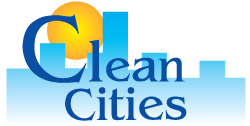

The Clean Cities Coalition Network is a coordinated group of nearly 100 coalitions in the United States working in communities across the country to advance affordable, domestic transportation fuels, energy-efficient mobility systems, and other fuel-saving technologies and practices.

The U.S. Department of Energy’s Office of Energy Efficiency and Renewable Energy's Vehicle Technologies Office facilitates national coordination of the coalitions through its Technology Integration Program. The Network consists of 79 coalitions that work with more than 15,000 local stakeholders that have helped shift nearly 10 billion gasoline gallon equivalents of conventional (fossil) fuel to alternative fuels or energy efficiency improvements, put more than 1.1 million alternative fuel vehicles on the road, and contributed to the expansion of alternative fueling station infrastructure since 1993. As of early 2020, there were more than 29,000 fueling stations across the United States that provided at least one of the following alternative fuels: ethanol (E85), biodiesel, compressed natural gas (CNG), electric, hydrogen, liquefied natural gas (LNG), renewable natural gas, or propane.

== Illinois ==
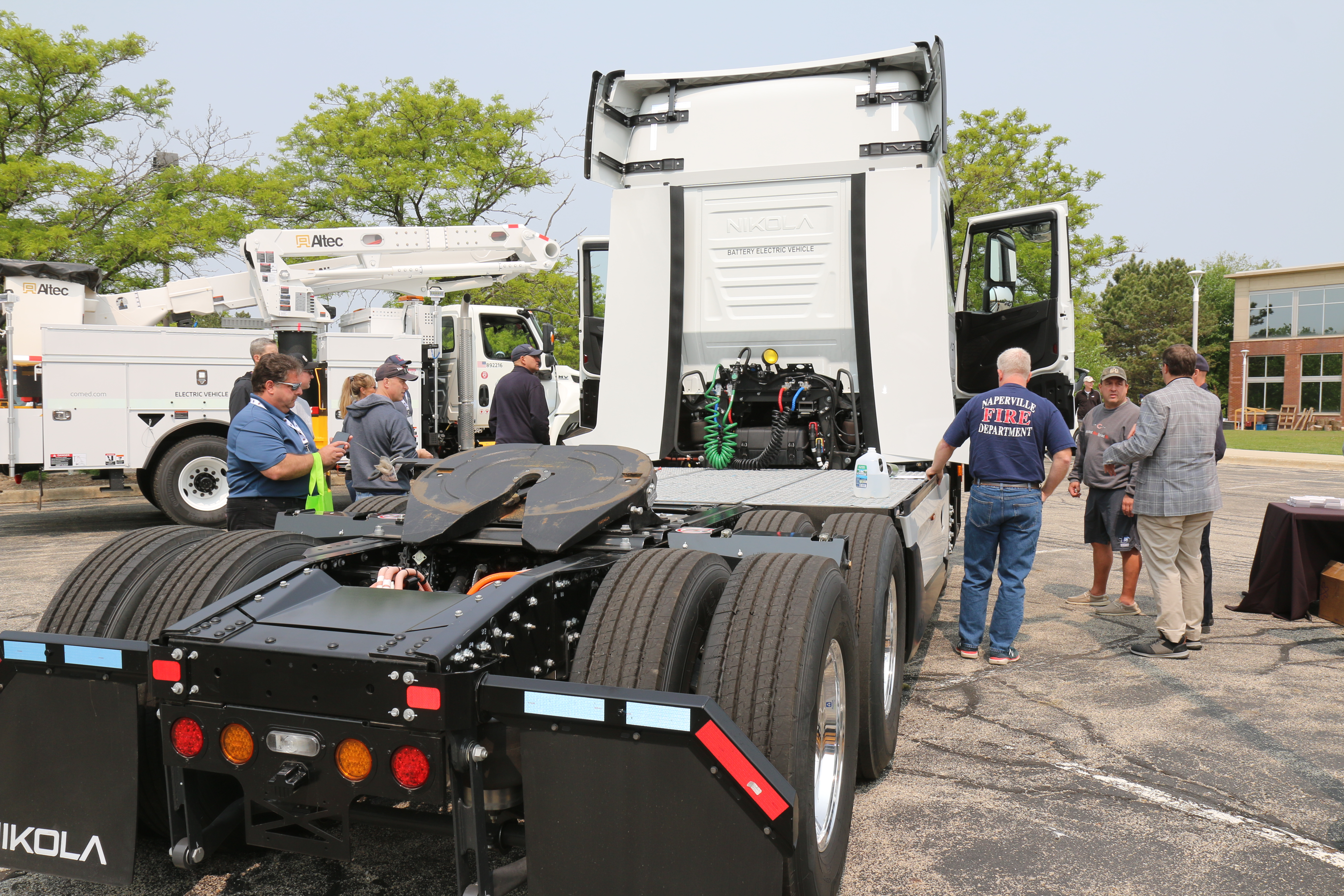
An alt fuel semi-truck at Green Drives Conference & Expo in 2023.

Illinois' Clean Cities coalition began as Chicago Area Clean Cities on May 13, 1994, and was the fifth Clean Cities coalition to launch under the U.S. Department of Energy's Clean Cities program, founded in 1993. In 2022, the coalition expanded to include the entire state and changed its name to Illinois Alliance for Clean Transportation (IACT).

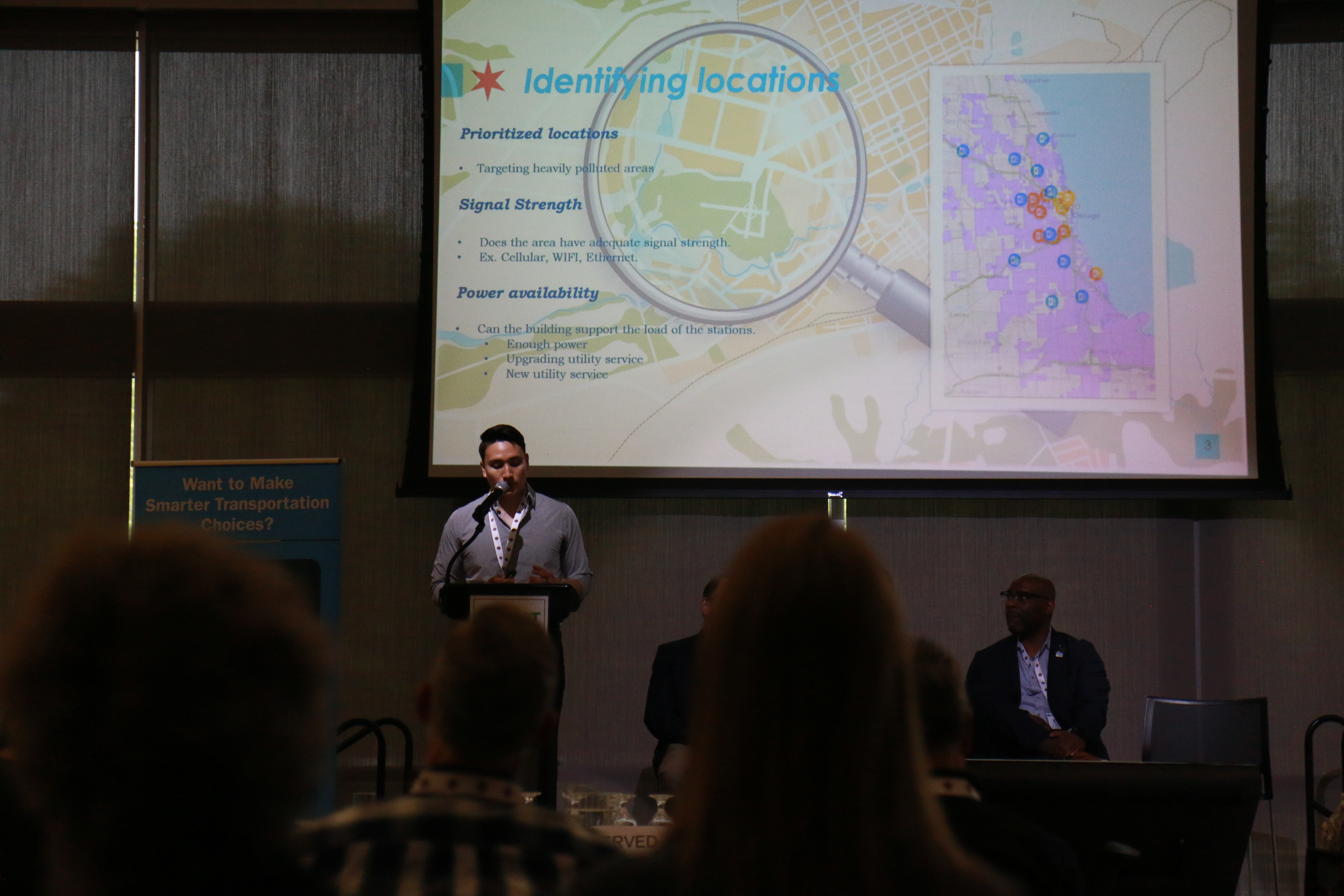
Giordy Lem, Manager of Vehicle Maintenance for the City of Chicago's Department of Assets, Information & Services, was one of the many speakers at Green Drives Naperville in 2023.

The mission of the IACT is to advance energy, economic, and environmental security of the U.S. by supporting the reduction of petroleum consumption. This is accomplished at the local level through:

- Coordinating efforts to obtain funding to implement clean fuel and petroleum displacement projects
- Initiating and supporting legislation and programs that promote clean fuels, clean fuel vehicles, idle reduction, enhanced fuel economy and other clean technologies
- Developing fueling infrastructure in the State of Illinois to support a diverse clean fuel market
- Educating the public about the operation and benefits of clean fuels and technologies
- Incorporating as many clean-fuel vehicles as possible throughout Illinois

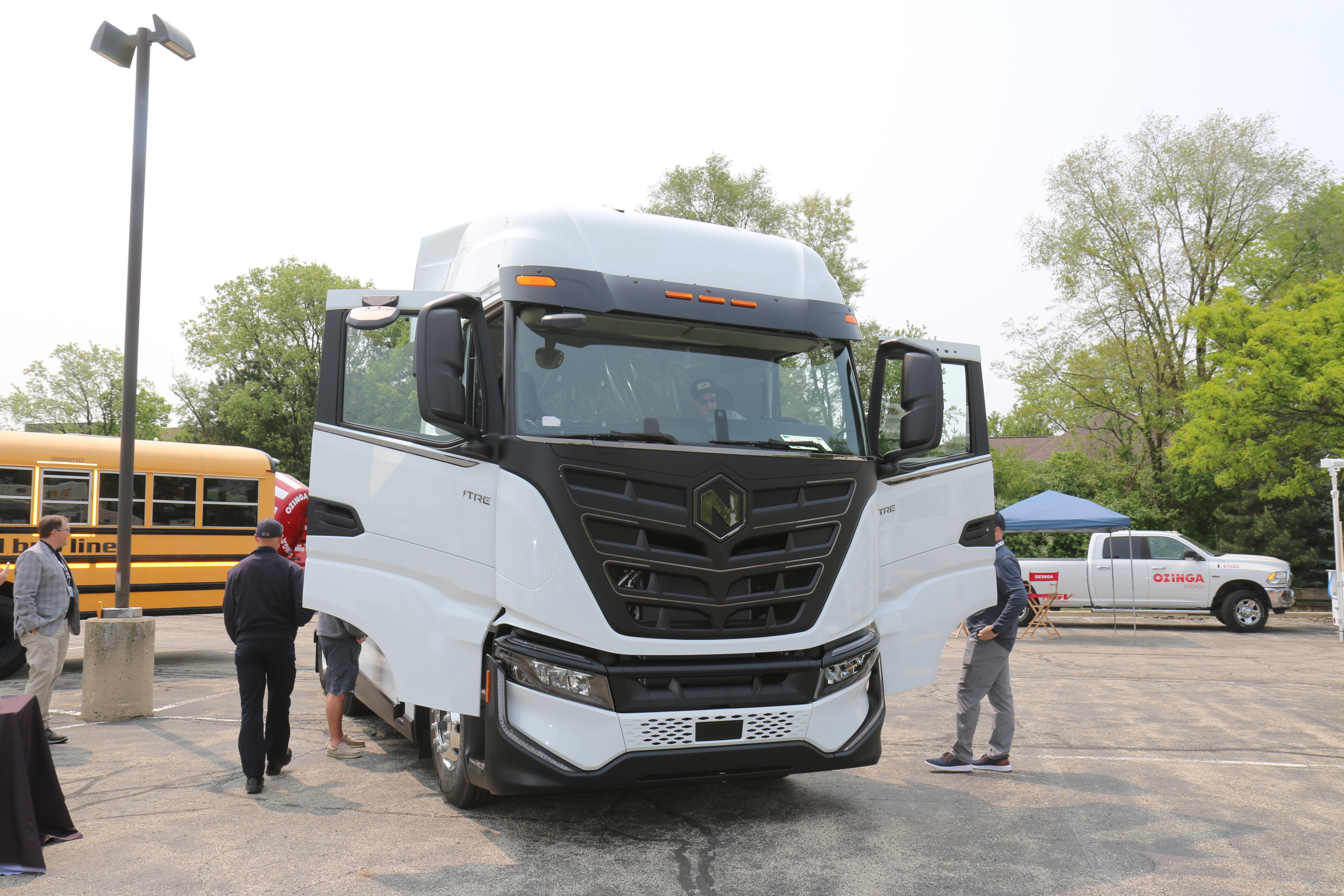
An alternative fuel fleet vehicle on display at Green Drives Conference and Expo.

In 30 years, IACT has displaced 200 million gasoline-gallon equivalents of petroleum, reduced greenhouse-gas emissions by 159,000 tons, encouraged stakeholders to use 13,000 alternative fuels, electric and hybrid vehicles, and helped create 1,700 new electric vehicle charging stations in the Chicago area.

IACT supports many events within the clean transportation sector but also currently hosts Green Drives Conference and Expo annually in two different Illinois cities. The conference is one of the largest clean-transportation conferences held in the Midwest and is attended by government officials, commercial and municipal fleet managers, corporate sustainability officers, and clean-tech and clean-energy professionals who want to learn how to use cleaner, lower emissions fuels and technologies while saving money.

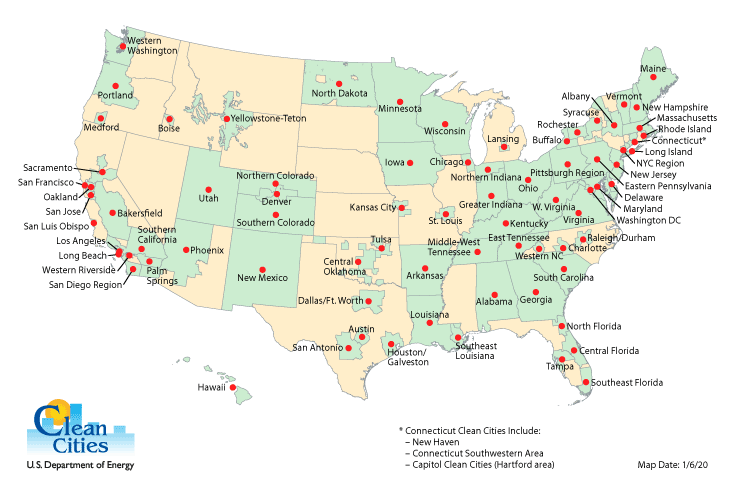
U.S. DOE Clean Cities coalitions in early 2020.

== Indiana ==
The State of Indiana contains only one designated Clean Cities coalitions: Drive Clean Indiana. Established on June 15, 1999, by the U.S. Department of Energy, Drive Clean Indiana serves the entire state of Indiana. They are the 71st designated United States Clean Cities Coalition.

Drive Clean Indiana is a government/industry partnership designed to help reduce petroleum consumption in the transportation sector. Through these steps, Drive Clean Indiana promotes alternative fuels, reduces greenhouse gas emissions, fosters public/private partnerships, and supports economic development. Drive Clean Indiana promotes the use of clean fuels and clean vehicle technology to reduce the environmental impact caused by the industrial practices of the late nineteenth century in the state. The following table lists the various impacts due to Drive Clean Indiana:

Category	Impact
Annual Energy Impact	23,259,550 gasoline gallon equivalents
Annual Energy Impact by Alternative Fuel Vehicles	21,419,173 gasoline gallon equivalents
Annual Emissions Reduced	105,771 tons of carbon dioxide equivalent
Annual Emissions Reduced by Alternative Fuel Vehicles	83,908 tons of carbon dioxide equivalent

Some of Drive Clean Indiana's projects:

- Drive Clean Rural USA – The objective of this project is to bring together rural government leaders, business owners, fleet managers, farmers, and industry experts to accelerate rural communities' access to clean fuel transportation solutions. Drive Clean Rural USA is a three-phase project that will run through June 2024.
- EMPOWER Workplace Charging – It is a national partnership between 32 Clean Cities Coalitions and other key stakeholders to provide educational and technical assistance to various entities looking to install electric vehicle charging stations.
- Indiana Green Fleet Program – Drive Clean Indiana manages the Indiana Green Fleet program for metropolitan planning organizations, including the Michiana Area Council of Governments (MACOG) and the Northwestern Indiana Regional Planning Commission (NIRPC). The goal of the program is to improve the environmental performance of business and government vehicle fleets across each respective MPO's territory through diesel retrofits and other strategies.
- Michigan to Montana (M2M) I-94 Clean Fuel Corridor – This project seeks to ensure a 1,500-mile span of Interstate 94 from Port Huron, Michigan, to Billings, Montana, will have adequate fueling sites to serve alternative fuel and electric vehicle driver needs.

== Maryland ==
The Washington Metropolitan Area Transportation Authority, better known as simply "Metro", is the authority provides transit services to the metropolitan area in and around Washington, D.C. The authority has a fleet of 1,500 buses, including 74 hybrid electric buses and Metro plans to have nearly 500 more hybrid-electric buses by 2012. Vice Maryland Governor Martin O'Malley, who last year committed to convert the entire Maryland Transit Administration bus fleet to hybrid-electric buses by 2014. Maryland has accelerated its purchase of hybrid-electric buses with the help of Recovery Act funds (Clean Cities).

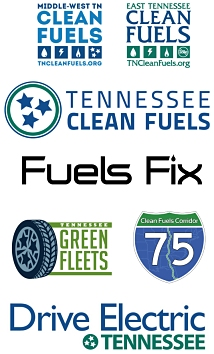
The logos for the Tennessee Clean Cities Programs, as well as some other logos for projects or initiatives that these coalitions operate.

== Tennessee Clean Fuels ==
The state of Tennessee has two designated Clean Cities coalitions: the East Tennessee Clean Fuels Coalition and the Middle-West Tennessee Clean Fuels Coalition. They sometimes operate under the shared name "Tennessee Clean Fuels". Both were designated in 2004, and collectively serve the entire state.

Many fleets in Tennessee use alternative fuels like the Great Smoky Mountains National Park; cities like Knoxville, Nashville, Sevierville and Kingsport; Oak Ridge National Laboratory; utilities and airports; mass transit agencies; and large international companies like UPS and Waste Management.

The East Tennessee coalition – ETCleanFuels – has started numerous projects and initiatives over the years, such as:

- Fuels Fix – It is website and monthly email service that provides "Clean Cities stories and alternative fuel news." Each month, articles are submitted by various Clean Cities Coalitions from different states and are published here.
- I-75 Green Corridor Project – It was a project that ETCleanFuels led from 2009 to 2015 that installed 40 biofuel pumps along I-75. Both ethanol E-85 and biodiesel B-20 pumps were installed during the project.
- Tennessee Green Fleets – It is a fleet certification program that offers fleets of any type a way to get recognized for their efforts to reduce their petroleum use and increasing use of alternative fuels. Fleets have to meet criteria and submit data to get certified.
- Drive Electric Tennessee or DriveElectricTN – It is a statewide program that is a collaboration of many partners in Tennessee including Tennessee Valley Authority, the TDEC Office of Energy Programs, and many others. The partnership has developed an "EV Roadmap" for the state and as of 2020 is building out working groups that will tackle issues like awareness, infrastructure, policies and programs, and innovation to help drive electric vehicle adoption across the state.

== Wisconsin ==
The state of Wisconsin has one Clean City coalition designated in 1994 called Wisconsin Clean Cities.

== Empire Clean Cities ==
Empire Clean Cities is the Clean Cities coalition for New York City & the Lower Hudson Valley (Westchester, Rockland, & Putnam Counties). ECC was incorporated in 2007 and was formerly known as New York City & Lower Hudson Valley Clean Cities.

== American Recovery and Reinvestment Act ==
On 2009 Earth Day, Vice President Joe Biden announced the availability of $300 million in funding from the American Recovery and Reinvestment Act for state and local governments and transit authorities to expand the nation's fleet of clean and sustainable vehicles as well as the fueling infrastructure necessary to support them.

The Clean Cities Alternative Fuel and Advanced Technology Vehicles Pilot Program supported 25 cost-share projects involving alternative fuels or advanced vehicles in collaboration with 50 Clean Cities coalitions and 700 stakeholders who provided an additional $500 million in matching funds. Eligible technologies included a number of different light and heavy-duty vehicles, including hybrid, plug-in hybrid electric, hydraulic hybrid, electric, fuel cell, and compressed natural gas vehicles. In addition, these projects supported refueling infrastructure for alternative fuels, including biofuels and natural gas. Other efforts eligible for funds included public awareness campaigns and training programs on alternative fuel and advanced technology vehicles and infrastructure. The program required a 50% cost share from participants.

These projects established 1,380 alternative fueling stations and put more than 9,000 alternative fuel and advanced technology vehicles on the road. The Clean Cities Coalition Network compiled a report, Designing a Successful Transportation Project: Lessons Learned from the Clean Cities American Recovery and Reinvestment Act Projects, summarizing high-level project design and administrative considerations for conducting a successful transportation project.

== Criticism ==
In 2009, the California Cars Initiative stated that the Clean Cities American Recovery and Reinvestment Act Project Awards included a scattering of funding for electrification and charging stations, but most of it was for carbon-based liquid fuels or non-pluggable hybrids. Clean Cities federal funding in 2010–2011 was set up with a majority of the funding favoring plug-in EVs and HEVs. However, the amount of funding and focus of that funding keeps changing due to advancements in technology and public interest in those fuels. CNG and propane were more popular in the early 2000s, the biofuels ethanol and biodiesel took importance in the mid-2000s.

The U.S. Department of Energy has awarded nearly $460 million through its funding opportunities for hundreds of projects across the country to implement alternative fuels and energy-efficient vehicle technologies. These awards leveraged almost $1.2 billion more in matching funds and in-kind contributions from the private and public sectors. These project awards contribute to advancing affordable, domestic transportation fuels and fuel-saving technologies and practices.

Funded projects include:

- Understanding transportation electrification in public and private fleets.
- Integrating alternative fuel vehicles and refueling infrastructure in urban and rural communities.
- Implementing living lab projects that demonstrate and assess new mobility solutions that maximize the return on investment to mobility systems.
- Developing fueling and charging stations along busy transportation corridors.
- Providing resiliency planning through diversified vehicle and fueling options.
- Securing real-world data on total cost of ownership for alternative fuels.

== See also ==
- EPA Sustainability
- Greenhouse gas emissions by the United States
- Nashville Auto Diesel College
- National Alternative Fuels Training Consortium
- Ohio Technical College
- Phase-out of fossil fuel vehicles
- Southeast Propane Autogas Development Program
- Tarrant County College
- Traviss Career Center
- York Technical College
- Zero-emission zone
