= Municipal wastewater treatment energy management =

Sustainable energy management in the wastewater sector applies the concept of sustainable management to the energy involved in the treatment of wastewater. The energy used by the wastewater sector is usually the largest portion of energy consumed by the urban water and wastewater utilities. The rising costs of electricity, the contribution to greenhouse gas emissions of the energy sector and the growing need to mitigate global warming, are driving wastewater utilities to rethink their energy management, adopting more energy efficient technologies and processes and investing in on-site renewable energy generation.

== Importance ==
Among the water and wastewater services of a city, wastewater treatment is usually the most energy intense process.

Wastewater treatment plants are designed with the purpose of treating the influent sewage to a set quality before discharging it back into a water body, without real concern for the energy consumption of the treating units of a plant. These facilities play the important role to protect not only the water systems but also the human health, preventing the discharge of pathogens normally present in the municipal sewage. Despite the key role of wastewater facilities, energy consumption can not be ignored anymore because of its contribution to greenhouse gas emissions and the need to reduce the emissions to mitigate global warming, as established by the Kyoto Protocol in 1997 and most recently, by the Paris Agreement. Moreover, there is uncertainty concerning energy costs. Because for a wastewater utility energy costs represent the second highest cost after labour, an increase in energy rate would further increase the operational budget of a municipality, and consequently, the service rates for consumers.

Therefore, it is important for the wastewater sector to invest in strategies to limit the demand of energy from the grid in order to mitigate both costs and greenhouse gas emissions.

== Global challenges ==
Population growth, urbanisation, climate change and increasing demand for natural resources are among the future biggest challenges for the urban wastewater sector.

=== Population growth and urbanisation ===
World population and population density in urban settlements are expected to grow by 32% and 66% by 2050, respectively. An increase in population is expected to increase the volume of wastewater and sewage sludge requiring treatment. To handle a higher volume of sewage and sewage sludge, it is necessary to upgrade the existing wastewater facilities and the collection networks to collect, store and treat the expected additional volume. Therefore, an increase in volume translates in high future investment costs for a sector that has a low cost recovery rate. Moreover, as shown by Mizuta, there is a direct correlation between the volume of sewage treated and the energy consumption of a wastewater treatment plant. Hence, a rise in energy demand is expected with the upgrading of the existing wastewater facilities and the construction of new ones to cope with future population increase.

=== Climate change ===
Greenhouse gas emissions from human activities have almost doubled between 1970 and 2010. The increase in greenhouse gases is held responsible for the changes in climate that have caused impacts on natural systems across all continents and oceans. In particular, climate change has affected the water cycle, increasing the precipitation intensity and variability, increasing in this way the risks of floods and droughts in many areas. The changes that have affected the water cycle have had substantial impacts on the aquatic ecosystems, increasing and worsening the stressors already affecting these systems. Nutrient loading represents one of those stressors as, with the change in precipitation patterns, it is expected a substantial increase in nutrients entering aquatic ecosystems due to increased erosion events and frequent sewage systems overflows. Because wastewater treatment plants discharge the treated wastewater in aquatic ecosystems, the target nutrient load of these ecosystems affects the level of treatment that a wastewater treatment plant has to perform on the wastewater before being allowed to discharge it. Higher native levels of nutrients in the receiving water bodies force wastewater treatment plants to perform more stringent nutrients removal from the wastewater before dispose of it. In addition to stricter discharge limits, future standards for currently unregulated contaminants are most likely to be introduced. The combination of more stringent limits and new treatment requirements might further increase the already significant energy demand of these facilities.

Population growth and climate change are increasing the energy needs of wastewater facilities. Because fossil fuels are still the most diffused source of energy, providing more than half of the global energy needs, the wastewater sector is still highly dependent on fossil fuel-based energy sources. Electricity, for example, is sourced from the electricity grid while gas and diesel are generally used on-site for heating and to run backup generators. High consumption of fossil-fuel energy makes the wastewater sector an indirect contributor to greenhouse gas emissions since fossil fuels are one of the biggest emitters of greenhouse gases, contributing for 65% of the CO_{2} emissions globally.

=== Resource recovery ===
The pressure to reduce greenhouse gas emissions to mitigate climate change and the increasing demand for natural resources is compelling the wastewater sector to develop innovative and more efficient practices to operate. Wastewater contains energy, nutrients and other organic and inorganic resources that can be successfully recovered and used in a broad range of applications. Energy can be recovered as biogas and heat. Biogas is an energy source with a wide range of uses, whereas heat has proven valuable for heating and cooling applications of buildings. Among the nutrients, phosphate can be recovered as struvite for fertilisers, a very important application since phosphate resources are limited and depletable. Composted sewage sludge finds applications in agricultural setting and urban gardens as soil amendment. Besides energy and nutrients, the effluent from the wastewater treatment plants can be reused as quality irrigation water both in agricultural and landscape applications. The reuse of treated water is especially valuable in countries with limited rainfall events or long periods of drought. All these possibilities are changing the vision of wastewater management and the role of wastewater treatment plants. Wastewater treatment plants have the potential not only to treat the wastewater but also to become resource recovery facilities

== Energy ==
Effective strategies adopted by wastewater utilities to reduce energy consumption and dependence from fossil fuel-based energy sources include increasing energy efficiency and generating renewable energy on site.

=== Energy efficiency ===
Since the recognition of anthropogenic causes of climate change in the late 1980s and the identification of the energy sector as one of the main contributors, there has been a global effort to investigate the energy consumption of human activities and their indirect contribution to greenhouse gas emissions. In Europe the energy analysis of the wastewater sector was conducted adopting mainly two strategies. Germany (MURL, 1999) and Switzerland (BUWAL, 1994), for example, developed energy management manuals for wastewater treatment plants and reduced their energy consumption by 38% and 50%, respectively. These manuals provided wastewater utilities with energy targets to achieve. On the other hand, in 1999 Austria promoted benchmarking that allowed annual comparison of wastewater treatment plants energy performances. This comparison stimulated a competition among the wastewater treatment plants and the aspiration to improve their efficiency, which led Austria to be one of the first countries in the world to achieve energy neutrality in the wastewater sector. The energy benchmarking process has allowed wastewater treatment plants to identify their most energy-consuming assets and possible inefficiencies, and target them to reduce their energy demand. For example, the inefficiency of the aeration process identified by multiple studies has allowed the development of more energy efficient oxidation units, with a possible energy saving of about 20% to 50% in some cases according to Frijns and an EPA study.

=== Renewable energy generation ===
Increased energy efficiency has allowed wastewater treatment plants to comply with discharge limits reducing the energy demand even up to 50% without affecting treatment performances. However, energy efficiency strategies by themselves are not sufficient to achieve independence from the electricity grid and fossil fuel-based energy sources. To achieve energy neutrality, multiple studies have looked at the feasibility of integrating a variety of renewable energy sources into wastewater treatment plants. The wastewater itself is a carrier of energy and a theoretical calculation, based on the characteristic of the sewage, shows that the composition of the embedded energy is 80% thermal energy and 20% chemical energy. The thermal energy can be recovered as heat while the chemical energy is recovered as biogas.

Renewable energy generation on site, in addition to increased energy efficiency, has already allowed at least twelve plants worldwide not only to achieve energy neutrality but also to produce more energy than they need. Energy efficiency programs and renewable energy generation have proven successful in diminishing the dependence of the wastewater sector from the energy grid, reducing treatment costs and the environmental impact associated with the grid connection.

== Advantages of on-site renewable energy generation ==
The production and recovery of energy on-site offers numerous advantages contributing to operation and management cost reduction of the treatment processes, source of revenue, contribution to waste management and the cost associated with it and increased resilience in case of power shortage.

One of the main advantages of energy generation on site is the less stringent dependence from the electricity grid and the cost mitigation associated with it. Depending on the level of renewable energy generation, wastewater treatment plants can disconnect from the main grid when the electricity is the most expensive, usually during peak hours and simply avoid the more elevated price of these periods. When feed in tariffs are in place, wastewater treatment plants can sell electricity to the grid and reduce costs through the cost recovery of the sold energy. In some cases, energy utilities offer demand response programs, in which a wastewater utility is given a financial incentive if it disconnects when requested by the energy utility. This helps the energy utilities to mitigate energy peak demands reducing the risks of blackout, and it is source of revenue for the wastewater utilities.

In countries where a rrenewable energy target has been introduced, the production of renewable energy allows the wastewater sector to get a certificate for every unit of power they produce. The certificates are then bought by the electricity retailers, that surrender them every year to comply with the renewable energy regulation.

Another advantage of renewable energy production, in specific of biogas from sewage sludge, is the contribution to waste management. In fact the recovery of the chemical energy involves the reduction of the sewage sludge volume. A smaller volume of sewage sludge is cheaper to transport and dispose of, decreasing operational costs.

Moreover, a diversify portfolio of energy source can contribute to a more resilient response in case of energy shortage and grid problems.

== Barriers to on-site renewable energy generation ==
Despite the numerous advantages offered by on-site renewable energy generation, wastewater utilities are experiencing several difficulties in integrating renewables in their facilities.

From a survey conducted by Beca it emerged that one of the biggest barrier is that energy generation is not core business for wastewater utilities and renewable energy projects come with technical challenges and high initial investment costs. Moreover, each plant presents differences and it requires a customised solution for each situation, making it hard to generalise solution for the all sector. There is a lack of guidelines and roadmaps to follow, so each utility has to create specific solutions for their wastewater treatment plants.

The changing price of electricity connected with the fossil fuel price can affect the return time on the investment while the fast changing regulatory panorama increases the uncertainty of the investment and the financial value of it. This can create an unsustainable situation, where investments in renewables projects can happens only when there are subsidies given by the government.

In the specific situation of biogas production, poor management can increase the fugitive emission of greenhouse gas emissions, reducing the environmental benefits of renewable energy generation.
