= Southeast Propane Autogas Development Program =

American sustainable energy initiative

The Southeast Propane Autogas Development Program is an initiative focused on converting public and private fleet vehicles from gasoline to propane autogas in the Southeastern United States. It is the largest Clean Cities alternative fuel vehicle conversion deployment program in history. The program is partially funded by the American Recovery and Reinvestment Act of 2009 (ARRA) through the United States Department of Energy Clean Cities Coalition.

== Overview ==
The program is converting approximately 1,100 vehicles from gasoline to propane autogas and implementing more than twenty propane autogas fueling stations. The program is administered by Virginia Clean Cities and the Virginia Department of Mines, Minerals and Energy, and is partially funded by an $8.6 million grant from the ARRA. The Program's website states that "under this large-scale initiative, public and private fleet vehicles in Washington D.C. and nine southeast states ... will be converted to propane autogas in order to reduce vehicle emissions, displace gasoline consumption and create American jobs."

== Program goals ==
The stated goals for the program:

- The displacement of an "estimated 15.7 million gallons of gasoline"
- Elimination of an "estimated 16,000 tons or more of airborne pollutants"
- The creation of "dozens of jobs" in the region

The program has several types of public and private fleet participants, including law enforcement, municipal, and transportation service fleets, that are converting anywhere between 5 and 300 of their fleet vehicles to propane autogas. The vehicles are equipped with the PRINS VSI system and are bi-fuel vehicles, meaning they can switch from propane autogas to gasoline. Some fleets estimate they will save more than $100,000 in fuel costs annually with propane autogas. Additionally, autogas is a cleaner-burning transportation fuel and up to 90 percent of the U.S. supply is domestically produced.

== Cost share requirement ==
This program, as well as other Clean Cities projects funded by ARRA grants, had a strict 50 percent cost-share requirement from the grant recipient and partners. AutoGas was selected by the program administrators to provide vehicle conversion equipment and to supply autogas fueling to fleet participants. The cost share provided by Alliance AutoGas and other program partners is estimated to be over $11 million.

== Leadership ==
The program was conceived under the Virginia Clean Cities leadership of Chelsea Jenkins. It was later supported by the Peter Denbigh, Jamison Walker, Alleyn Harned, and Matt Wade.
