= Expeller pressing =

Mechanical method for extracting liquids

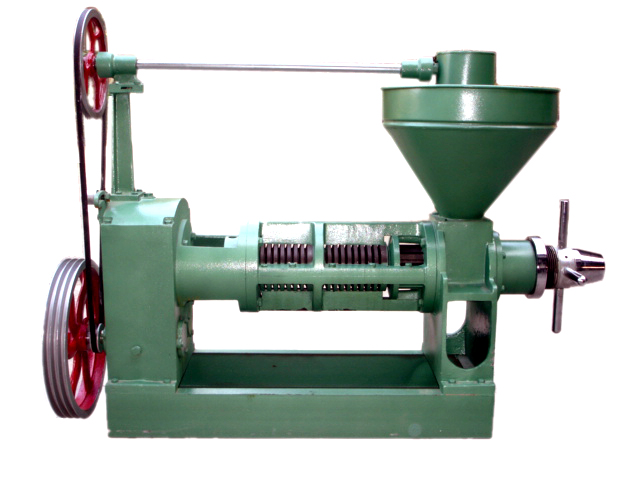
An expeller used for expeller pressing

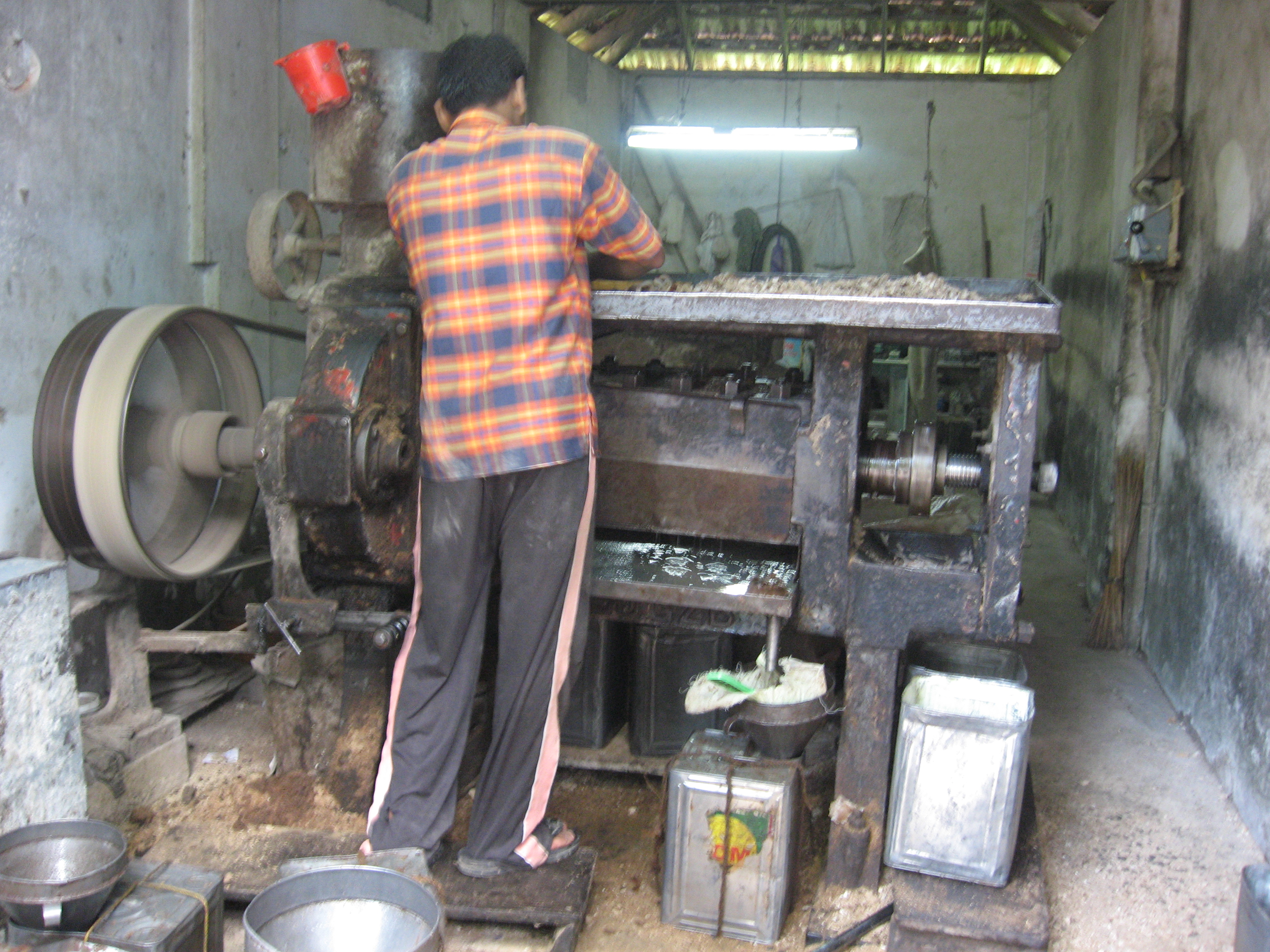
Coconut oil is expelled from copra at an oil mill in Thrippunithura, Kerala, India

Expeller pressing (also called oil pressing) is a mechanical method for extracting oil from raw materials. The raw materials are squeezed under high pressure in a single step. When used for the extraction of food oils, typical raw materials are nuts, seeds and algae, which are supplied to the press in a continuous feed. As the raw material is pressed, friction causes it to heat. In the case of harder nuts, which require higher pressure, the material temperature can exceed 120 °F (49 °C). "Expeller" is a trademarked term of Anderson International Corporation since 1900, although it has become genericized, is often confused with screw press equipment in general, and does not indicate whether oil extraction is done hot or cold.

== Description ==
An expeller press is a screw-type machine that mainly presses oil seeds through a caged barrel-like cavity. Some other materials processed with an expeller press include meat by-products, synthetic rubber and animal feeds.

Raw materials enter one side of the press and waste products exit the other side. The machine uses friction and continuous pressure from the screw drive to move and compress the seed material. The oil seeps through small openings that do not allow seed fiber solids to pass. Afterward, the seeds are formed into a hardened press cake, which is removed from the machine.

Pressure involved in expeller pressing creates heat in the range of 140–210 °F (60–99 °C). Raw materials are typically heated up to 250 °F (121 °C) to make the pressing more efficient; otherwise the pressing itself will heat the oil to 185–200 °F (85–93 °C). Some manufacturers use a cooling apparatus to reduce this temperature to protect certain properties of the oils being extracted – a process called cold-pressed where the extraction temperature is less than 120 °F (49 °C).

== Efficiency ==
Expeller processing cannot remove every last trace of liquid (usually oil) from the raw material. A significant amount remains trapped inside the cake remaining after pressing. In most small-scale rural situations this is of little importance, as the remaining cake after oil extraction finds uses in local dishes, in the manufacture of secondary products, or in animal feed. Some raw materials do not release oil by expelling, the most notable being rice bran. To remove oil from commodities that do not respond to expelling or to extract the final traces of oil after expelling, it is necessary to use solvent extraction.

== Design ==
=== Continuous screw ===
The earliest expeller presses utilized a continuous screw design. The compression screws were much like the screws of a screw conveyor—that is, the helicoid flighting started at one end and ended at the other.

=== Interrupted screw ===
Valerius Anderson invented the interrupted screw design and patented it in the year 1900. Anderson observed that in the continuous flighting arrangement of a compression screw, there are tendencies for slippery materials either to co-rotate with the screw or to pass through with minimal dewatering. He wrote that "brewers' slops, slaughterhouse refuse" and other "soft and mushy" materials dewater poorly in continuous screw presses.

His invention consisted of putting interruptions in the flighting of a compression screw. It was much like having a hanger bearing in a screw conveyor: there is no flighting on the shaft at that point, so material tends to stop moving and pile up. It is only after solids accumulate in the gap that the downstream flighting catches material. When this happens, material is forced along its way. The result is better dewatering and thus a more consistent press cake.

=== Resistor teeth ===
After the 1900 patent, a major improvement was made with the addition of resistor teeth. Fitted into the gaps where there is no flighting, these teeth increase the agitation within the press, further diminishing co-rotation tendencies.

== Expanded applications ==
Applications of the interrupted screw design expanded to conditions of constant feed, at constant consistency. If either the consistency or the flow rate diminished, squeezing would diminish until it was inadequate for proper moisture removal. At the same time, if the consistency increased, the press could jam. To counteract these tendencies, it was necessary to build a heavy press, frequently with a costly variable speed drive. A Kern Kraft press provides a screw that will grind soybeans more efficiently than a screw used for pressing canola and other smaller seeds.

In contrast, it was found that the interruptions in the flighting of the Anderson screw would provide cushion within the press. If consistency decreased, compression was still effective. A plug of sufficiently solid material had to build up at each interruption before solids could progress toward the discharge. This self-correcting performance prevents wet material from purging at the cake discharge. It is achieved without varying the speed of the screw.

The economic advantages of these characteristics led to interrupted screw presses being used to dewater fibrous materials. Examples would be alfalfa, corn husk, and, more recently, paper mill fibers.

== See also ==
- Algaculture oil extraction
- Dewatering screw press
- Oil mill
