= Pulp and paper industry in Europe =

The pulp and paper industry in Europe accounts for about a quarter of the world production and is a major employer. The leading producing countries are Finland, Sweden and Germany. The industry is a large user of renewable energy and achieved a recycling rate of 71.5% in 2015.

== Production data ==
The European paper industry produces more than 90 million tonnes of paper and board and more than 36 million tonnes of pulp annually. Directly it provides 178,000 jobs and indirectly 3 million jobs along the forest and paper chain. The European paper industry's turnover is approximately 180 billion euros. 633 companies are represented by the Confederation of European Paper Industries (CEPI) and these account for 23% of world production. The raw material consists of 40% recycled fibre and 44% virgin pulp, the balance being other pulp (1%) and non-fibrous materials (15%). 94% of the wood requirements come from managed forests within Europe.

In national terms the largest paper producer is Germany, followed by Finland, Sweden and France; the largest pulp producers are Finland and Sweden. The two largest European companies in the sector, Stora Enso and UPM, are both based in Finland.

== Renewable energy ==
The European pulp and paper industry is the largest industrial producer and consumer of energy from renewable sources. Its share of biomass-based energy exceeds 55% of its total primary annual energy consumption of 1,301,483 TJ. The sector has adopted an objective to reduce carbon emissions of 80% by 2050, which is likely to involve new technological methods to reduce water usage and thus reduce energy usage.

== Recycling ==
Paper for recycling is a major source of the paper industry's raw material, which is why the industry aims to maximise the European recycling rate. The recycling rate along the paper value chain (ERPC) reached 71.5% in 2015 - exceeding the voluntary target of 70% that was set by the industries declaration in 2011. The total amount of paper collected and sent to recycling in paper mills in 2015 was almost 56 million tonnes. 18.2% was exported for recycling in third countries in 2015. The recycling rate is now considered close to its maximum possible.

== Innovation ==
In 2011, the Confederation of European Paper Industries (CEPI) launched the “2050 Roadmap to a low-carbon bioeconomy”, as the first European manufacturing industry sector to react to the European Commission's roadmap towards a low-carbon economy with its own sector roadmap. The “Two Team Project”, which ran in 2013, sought to find the most innovative breakthrough technologies of the industry with two teams competing against each other. Eight breakthrough technologies made it to the publication. In 2015, CEPI collected more than 40 of the industry's most innovative products in another publication, “The Age of Fibre”.

== Leading companies ==
In 2011 the top 10 forest and paper products companies in Europe were:

Rank	Company	Country
1	Stora Enso	Finland
2	UPM	Finland
3	SCA	Sweden
4	Smurfit Kappa	Ireland
5	Mondi Group	Austria
6	Metsäliitto	Finland
7	Sequana Capital	France
8	DS Smith	United Kingdom
9	Norske Skog	Norway
10	Lenzing	Austria
