= Gilbon River =

Coordinates: 33.03966°N 35.66266°E

Gilbon river
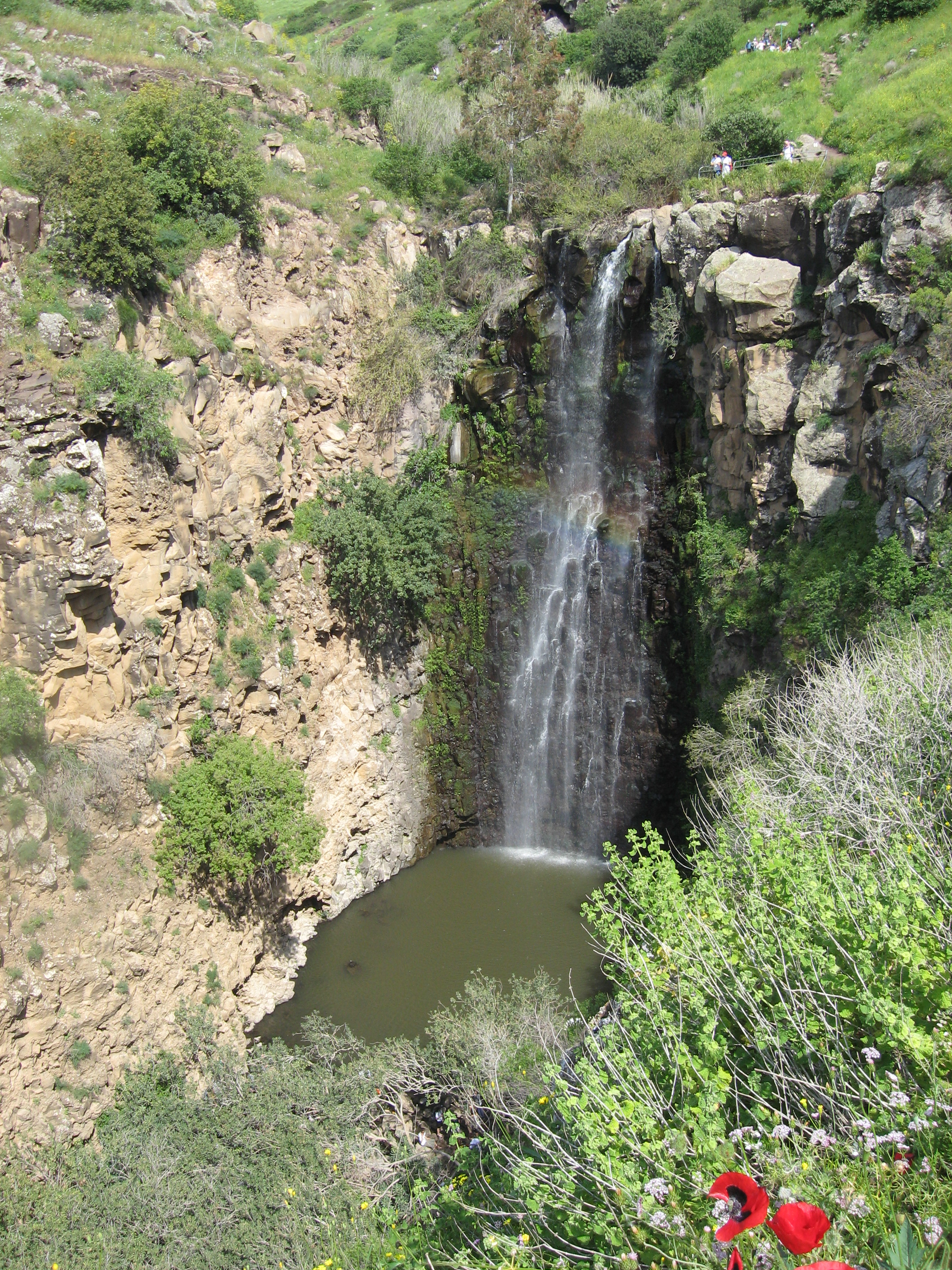
- Etymology: Israeli used name is after an ancient Jewish village in the area

Location
- Country: Golan Heights

Basin features
- Waterfalls: Gilbon falls

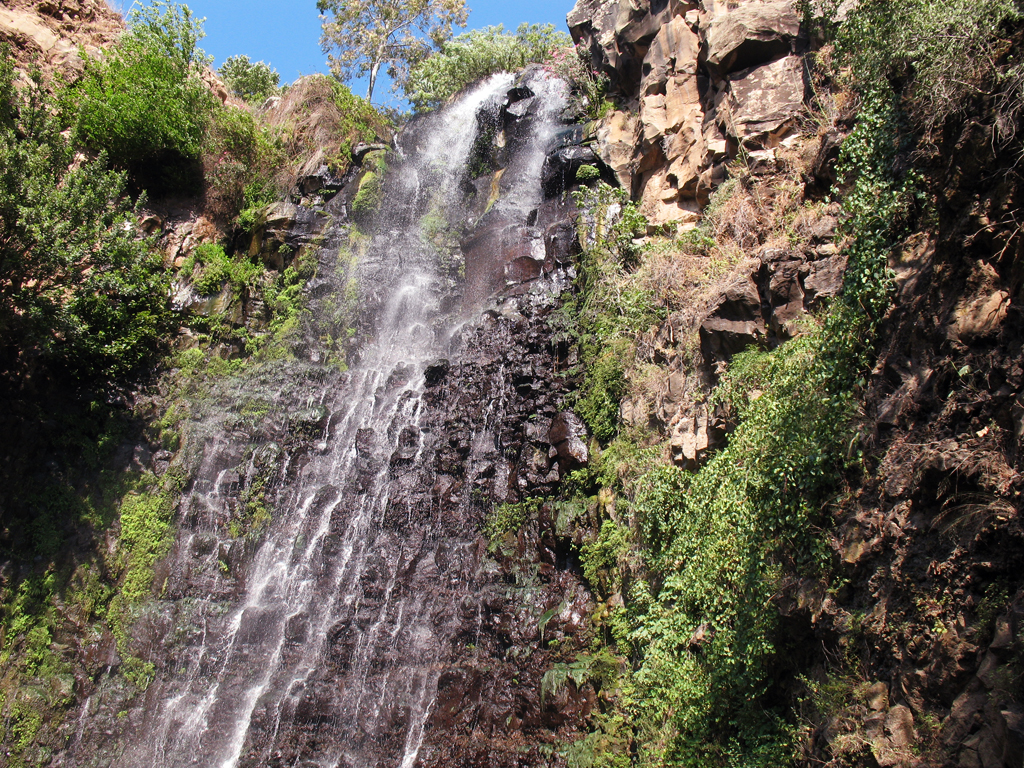
The falls

The Gilbon River (נחל גילבון) is a stream and nature reserve in the Golan Heights.

== Etymology ==
Its upper segment, known by the Arabic name Wadi Deir Seras, comes from a Bedouin village. Its central segment (Wadi Dabura) was named after the Bedouin village Dabura, nearby, which preserves the name of the ancient Jewish village of Dabura from the Mishnah and Talmud periods. The lower part, Wadi Jalabina, was named after the Bedouin village at the source of the stream.

== Description ==
Along the river are two large waterfalls: Deborah Falls, which is located on the eastern stretches of the river, and Gilbon Falls, which falls from a height of about 40 metres (130 ft) and is located a few hundred meters down the stream. The reserve is about 4 kilometres (2.5 mi) northeast of Kibbutz Gadot.
