= EPA Sustainability =

- EPA
- Environmental Protection Agency logo

Agency overview
- Formed: December 2, 1962
- Employees: 17,964 (2009)
- Annual budget: $10.5 billion (2010)
- Agency executive: Lisa P. Jackson, Administrator
- Website: www.epa.gov

The United States Environmental Protection Agency (EPA) was established in July 1970 when the White House and the United States Congress came together due to the public's demand for cleaner natural resources. The purpose of the EPA is to repair the damage done to the environment and to set up new criteria to allow Americans to make a clean environment a reality. The ultimate goal of the EPA is to protect human health and the environment.

Since the 1980s sustainability has become a term used in reference to environmental and human issues. Sustainability is typically defined as, the ability of current generations to meet their own needs without compromising the needs of future generations. This concept has recently been adopted by the EPA as they have dedicated an entire sector solely to sustainability. Environmental, social, and economic demands are the main components that stand behind the concept of sustainability.

As previously mentioned, the EPA has taken the initiative to establish a sector dedicated to promoting and practicing sustainability. This sector has been broken down into four broad categories: Urban Sustainability and the Built Environment; Water and Ecosystem Services; Energy, Biofuels, and Climate Change; and Material Management and Human Health.

== Urban sustainability and the built environment ==
With almost 80% of all US residents inhabiting urban areas and a constant increase in urban growth, the EPA has worked with many types of council to create a sector based solely on urban sustainability and the built environment. Changing how and where urban development takes place can greatly affect habitat protection, water resources, energy consumption, the quality and services provided by an ecosystem, and indoor and outdoor air quality. With recent findings showing more than 40% of energy consumption comes from buildings, the National Science and Technology Council (NSTC) published a report with an extensive agenda for research and development to reduce the consumption of natural resources, improve indoor environments and reduce emissions of harmful pollutants. With this, the EPA has created programs and resources to help states and their communities with promoting urban sustainability and supporting smart growth projects, green infrastructure and building design, energy efficient homes and commercial buildings, as well as helping to support the development of sustainability metrics for urban development.

=== Policies and programs ===
The EPA has created over 25 policies and programs to help with urban sustainability, ranging from "Building America" which works with the residential building industry to develop and implement building processes that save builders and homeowners millions; to "Smart Growth and Schools" which gives information on the principals of smart growth to plan educational facilities; to "Watershed" which shows how using a watershed approach can help to protect our water resources. One of the more successful programs the EPA utilizes is the "Green Building" program. Green Building is the practice of building structures and using methods that are environmentally responsible and resource-efficient. Many aspects go into Green Building such as the design, construction, operation, maintenance, renovation and deconstruction. This program helps to bring awareness to Green Building and create healthier, more resource-efficient aspects of construction.

=== Research, tools and technology ===
The sustainability sector of the EPA has helped with research, tools and technology of the built environment in many ways. One of the many tools they have helped to create is the Tools of Watershed Protection in Developing Areas. This program is an approach that uses eight tools that can be used to protect or restore water resources in an urbanized or developing watershed. The eight tools outlined in the watershed protection approach are land use planning, land conservation, aquatic buffers, better site design, erosion and sediment control, storm water best management practices, non-storm water discharges, and watershed stewardship programs. The watershed protection approach brings up key choices that a watershed manager should think about when using the eight tools as well as describing in great detail the purpose of the tools and outlining specific methods of how to utilize them.

=== Assessments and performance measures ===
One of the many ways the EPA measures environmental performance is with the Smart Growth Index (SGI). The Smart Growth Index is a GIS sketch model that is used to model alternative land use and transportation settings and assess their outcomes using signs of environmental performance. The EPA alone has worked with over 30 partners using the Smart Growth Index to produce land use and transportation decisions that arouse economic development, reduce monetary expenditures, protect the environment and improve quality of life.

== Water and ecosystem services ==
The water and ecosystem services section of sustainability works to ensure that natural resources are conserved in a way that allows for current and future generations to have access to them. It also works to find a balance between these natural resources and economic and social interests. Agriculture stands as a huge industry throughout the world, and the EPA works with the agricultural sector to help them meet regulations on their compliances by practicing sustainable management. The EPA has developed a program called the Ecological Research Program which conducts research that focuses on ecosystem services. They are hoping that sustainability efforts and stewardship will be promoted as these services are discovered. The project is also working to create indicators for the assessment and identification of ecosystem services. The hope is that this research will allow decision makers to better understand the value of particular ecosystems and work to improve the stewardship of the land.

Under EPA Administrator William K. Reilly, President’s George H. Bush’s appointee, so-called placed-based initiatives focused on interconnected land and water systems gained in importance because places resonated with the public in a way that parts-per-million just do not.

=== Policies and programs ===
The EPA has several programs ranging from agriculture to wetlands and everything in between. One of their programs, Cooperative Conservation is unique in that it extends to reach several other organizations that are working toward the same goal of sustainability. This program is a collaboration of partnership, stewardship and sustainability that works with over 80 groups and organizations to achieve environmental results larger than just what the EPA can provide.

=== Research, tools and technology ===
The sustainability sector of the EPA has also conducted a wide range of research to identify problem areas and identify essential tools to manage ecosystems that need to be protected. Monitoring is the key to success for any program implementation. The EPA has created the Environmental Monitoring and Assessment Program (EMAP) which works to discover the appropriate tools to assess the efficiency of ecological resources. This program is designed to increase understanding of the risks involved with current natural resources.

=== Assessments and performance measures ===
The EPA also releases reports on current trends of environmental resources and advisories for issues such as chemical contaminant levels. EPA has set up fish advisories, landscape ecological projects, national coastal condition reports and reports on the quality of American lakes. The fish advisories inform the public about possible health risks from high chemical contaminant levels. The advisory may recommend for people to limit and stop their consumption of certain fish species in particular regions. Landscape ecology projects focus on the relationships between the characteristics of the land and how they may tie in with possible risks of natural resources. Reports on national coastal condition provide information on the status of ecological and environmental components. The other report that EPA puts out through the water and ecosystem services sector is on the quality of American lakes; this informs both the public and Congress about the water quality in various lakes, rivers, and ponds within the United States.

== Energy, biofuels, and climate change ==
The EPA is one of the United States' chief providers of energy and is tasked with developing ways to help combat the country's reliance on fossil fuels. Research has shown that fossil fuels such as coal, natural gas and oil has resulted in 86% of the primary energy produced in the world as of 2006, and the EPA develops programs that promote efficient energy use and improve environmental quality without disturbing the country's energy supply.

=== Policies and programs ===
The EPA has created over 40 programs and policies towards helping to deal with biofuels and greenhouse gases as well as find ways to be more energy efficient and help to slow down climate change. Their climate programs provide models and processes to inventory greenhouse gas emissions and evaluate the effects of global change on the environment, human heath, and the US economy. Similarly, the EPA has also created the Clean Cities Program which supports public and private partnerships that organize clean burning alternative fuel vehicles and help to create the associated fueling infrastructure to improve the United States’ energy security and air quality.

=== Research, tools and technology ===
The Distributed Energy Program is a program utilized by the EPA to support cost-effective research and development aimed towards costs and emission reduction, as well as improving the reliability and performance of the US electric energy infrastructure. The Distributed Energy Program presents solutions to many of the most critical energy and electrical problems such as brownouts, blackouts, energy security problems, issues with power quality, stricter emissions standards, transmission bottlenecks, and a better control on energy costs.

=== Assessments and performance measures ===
The EPA assesses and measures energy, biofuels, and climate change many different ways. One very effective measure used by numerous environmental programs is the Environmental Indicators Initiative (EII) which was developed in 2001 to help the EPA in improving their reporting on the standing and tendencies of environmental conditions. As part of the EII, the EPA developed the Report on the Environment (ROE) project as a national report for the public and policy makers on the conditions of the United States' environment. The report is used to answer 23 questions about new developments in land, water and ecological systems with potential connections to human health that are related to their mission.

== Material management and human health ==
The EPA has also dedicated their time toward materials management & human health. Within the definition of sustainability lies the facets of many generations and therefore the long-term impacts created by man must be taken into consideration. The EPA has been involved in the promotion of the use of more environmentally friendly materials and chemicals since the development of its mission. Toxic chemicals pose threats to both the environment and people, but the EPA is working to lessen these impacts. EPA programs involved in the materials management & human health sector work to promote greener and cleaner products and production processes. These objectives not only benefit the environment, but they often result in costs that are less than traditional techniques.

=== Policies and programs ===
One of EPA’s most emphasized programs in this sector is called Children’s Health. Children are more vulnerable to effects of toxins or chemicals in the environment and the EPA has a priority for children’s health. The EPA has conducted much research in areas related to materials management and human health. They have studied air toxics, endocrine disruptors, pesticides, life cycle assessments, and more. There are over 20 other policies and programs in place for material management and human health. These include, but are not limited to environmental management systems, green suppliers network, national waste minimization program, pollution prevention partnerships, and sustainable futures. Each of aforementioned not only emphasize a greener environment, but they promote collaborative efforts among the target audiences.

=== Research, tools and technology ===
Several programs are dedicated to helping businesses and the larger industries to use more environmentally sound practices. There is a branch dedicated to the promotion of clean processes. The Clean Processes Branch works to provide applications that can be used in pollution prevention, reuse and recycling of materials, and understanding the life cycles of consumer products and industrial processes. Within this branch, research is conducted on green chemistry and engineering, metals recovery and recycling, pervaporation, watershed environmental and impact analysis, chemical process stimulation for waste reduction, and quantitative structure activity relationship.

=== Assessments and performance measures ===
Assessments and performance measures are also conducted by the EPA through reports, programs, and promotion of acceptable practices. For example, the EPA has a push for life cycle assessments. The life cycle assessment, also referred to as LCA, is a technique that is used to determine how a product or process impacts the environment from the very initial inputs to the final product. It is the interpretation of these results that can help companies to make decisions in favor of the environment.
