= Dewatering screw press =

Screw press

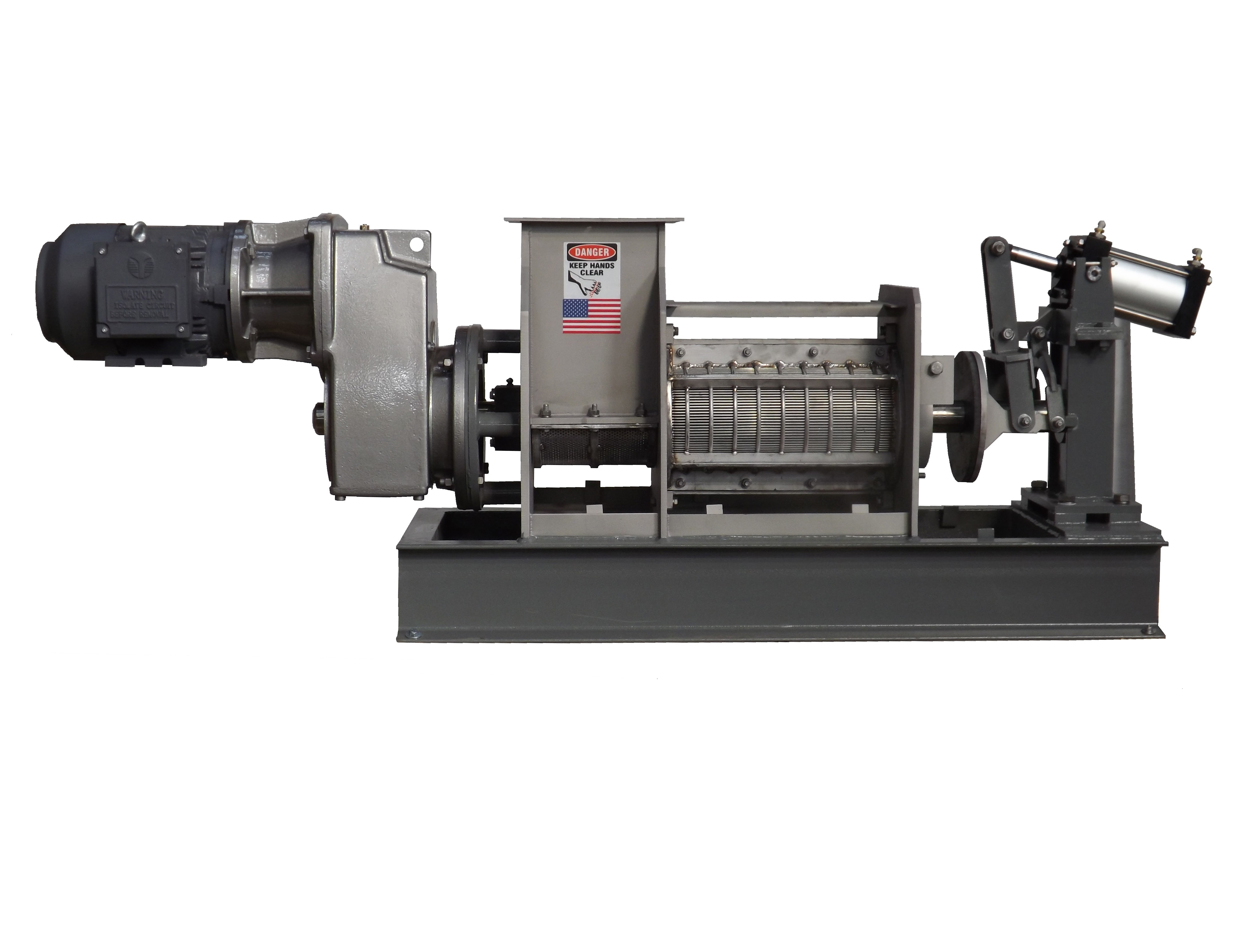
Dewatering screw press

A dewatering screw press is a screw press that separates liquids from solids. A screw press can be used in place of a belt press, centrifuge, or filter paper. It is a simple, slow moving device that accomplishes dewatering by continuous gravitational drainage. Screw presses are often used for materials that are difficult to press, for example those that tend to pack together. The screw press squeezes the material against a screen or filter and the liquid is collected through the screen for collection and use.

== History ==
An example of a dewatering press is a wine press. Dating back to Roman times, these machines worked similarly to the modern screw press but possessed some disadvantages which have been corrected and improved within modern presses. The ancient wine press only allowed for grapes to be juiced in batches and often a thick cake would form against the screen, making it difficult for the juice to flow through the screen and be collected for wine. Most modern screw presses allow for a continuous flow of material by surrounding the screw with a screen, which also helps to avoid the build up of a layer of solid material on the screen.

The most commonly known screw press of this design is said to have been invented by famous Greek mathematician Archimedes and is known as the screw conveyor. The screw conveyor consists of a shaft, which is surrounded by a spiral steel plate, similar in design and appearance to a corkscrew. This design is used in a multitude of screw presses. There are some machines of this and also of similar design that are not screw presses at all - they do not separate solids from liquids but are instead used to fuse them together. An example of this is a mold-filling machine. Plastic pellets are inserted at one end and heat is applied, melting the pellets and discharging them into a mold. Another example is known as a cooker-extruder and is used in the production of snack foods such as pretzels and more.

== Design ==
Most screw presses can have dilute materials pumped directly into the screw press, although pre-thickening sometimes improves the performance of the press. This is typically done with a static or sidehill screen, a rotating drum screen, belt press, or a gravity table.

Patented in 1900, Valerius Anderson's interrupted flight design is most commonly used as opposed to the continuous flight design. Anderson, upon studying the continuous flight design, noticed that it led to co-rotation and a less efficient job being done dewatering, especially with softer materials. He solved this by putting interruptions on the flights of the screw. The interruptions allowed for the materials to stop moving forward between interruptions along the shaft and also allows for an adequate buildup of the material before it is pushed through the screw press to container that catches the material. This allowed for a better job at the dewatering and a consistent cake material being released.

The interrupted flight design screw presses uses were broadened from just soft or mushy materials to include most materials screw presses were used for because unlike the continuous design screw presses the interrupted flight design did not require constant feed or consistency of material. If either were diminished in the continuous design so would production of the dewatered product, in order to avoid this while maintaining the continuous flight design a larger and heavier press with variable speed settings was a necessity; the press also entailed the need of an operator.

The interrupted flight design eliminated the need for consistency as the compression of the screw did not change as the material did not progress through the screw until a sufficient amount of the material had formed, as described above. This also eliminates the need for changing speed and an operator. The design allows for self-correction and efficiency that is unavailable with the continuous design. It allowed for a more economically effective screw press that has been used for more than just slimy or slippery materials.

After a period of time and its initial patent, resistor teeth were added to the presses where there was no flighting in order to increase the agitation of the materials adding to the limitation of the tendencies of co-rotation within the press

=== Options ===
The buildup of press cake moisture is controlled by a discharge door or cone. Screw presses possess different options that include perforated/slotted screens, a rotating cone, hard surfacing on the screw, and supplemental screen surface in the inlet hopper on the face of the cone. The standard construction for screw presses is of stainless steel with a carbon steel frame on the larger presses.

=== Capacity ===
The specific details of the design of a screw press depend on the material however. The configurations, screw speeds, screens for maximum outlet consistency, including an excellent capture rate vary per material. Most screw presses are designed to feed material that has a 40-60% water make up. The length and diameter ratio of the screw press also depends on the material.

=== Drive ===
Larger presses use a foot-mounted gearbox while smaller presses use a hollow-shaft gearbox. Currently, nearly all presses are driven by electric motors due to their reliable and low cost frequency drives. The electric motors replaced the previously popular hydraulic motor drives. A vertical design was popular in the 1800s through the 1950s but they are no longer made. Most screw presses are currently built with the screws in a horizontal configuration.

=== Compressive Mechanisms ===
Compression is created within the screw press by increasing the inner shaft diameter of the screw. For example, if a 16" screw press has a 6" shaft at the start, the flights on the screw will be 5" tall. If this 6" shaft diameter is then increased to 12" at the discharge, the fights will be only 2" tall at this point. Thus compression is applied as the material is being pressed from a 5" opening through a 2" space.

This compression can also be achieved tightening the separation of the flights of the screw. If at the inlet, the pitch is 16", the material thus will move 16" with each revolution. If it is then decreased to 8" at the point of discharge, the material will move 8" per revolution. This results in there being more volume forced into the press than there is being forced out of the press at a time. This creates the desired compression and pushes the liquid through the screen.

Another way to achieve compression is to place a cone at the point of discharge. This can also be called a choke, stopper, or door. In many designs it is bolted into a fixed position, making a fixed, smaller opening which the material must pass through. More commonly found however, the screw press has the cone pushed into the point of discharge via a hydraulic or air cylinder.

=== Specialized types ===
Some other types of presses are vapor-tight presses, and twin-screw presses. Vapor-tight presses are used during the production of soybean protein concentrate (SPC), citrus and apple pectin, bioresin, and Xanthan gum. Twin-screw presses contain two overlapping compression screws. This is more complicated on a mechanical level because the screws must remain synchronized in order for them to work properly. These are often used for slippery materials and feature an internal shredding action.

== Classification ==
There are two major kinds of screw presses of this design. One type, known as Expellers ®, removes water from fibrous material, while the other removes free liquid from a material.

=== Expellers ===
Oil expellers are used to squeeze the fat out of soybeans, peanuts, sunflower seeds, canola (rape seeds), and other oil seeds. The expeller works by exerting extremely high pressures which convert the fat in seeds into a liquid oil. Once the oil is liquefied the oil flows through the screen and is collected.

=== Removal of free liquid ===
Screw presses that are used to free liquid from material are commonly used in the pulp and paper industries, municipal biosolids, septage and grease trap sludge, food production, food waste, manure, and also within the chemical industry.

== Applications ==
=== Pulp and paper industries ===
Pulp and paper industries remove water within cellulose fiber.

=== Sewage disposal ===
Biosolids are dewatered and heated through a specific process which includes raising the pH to a level of 12. Septage and grease trap sludge is dewatered with a simple screw press of the above stated design. Nutrient management programs dewater hog and cow manure for sale and commercial use.

=== Food processing ===
Alcohol solutions are squeezed from foods with screw presses (such as soybeans, protein, pectin, and xanthan gum.) Food processing factories use screw presses to separate water from waste streams and convert the solid into animal feeds. For example, sugar beet pulp, orange peel, and spent grain.

Fish and orange peel dewatering often provide maximum yield when dewatered within a press of the interrupted flight design and with the addition of steam begin injected into the material. Commonly steam injection holes are drilled into the resistor teeth of the press close to the screw's shaft.

=== Chemical industry ===
Within the chemical industry screw presses are used for "ABS, sodium alginate and carrageenan, synthetic rubber, synthetic resin, hydrated polymer, naphthalene, elastomeric adhesive, color film emulsion, CmC, pharmaceuticals" and more.
