= Forestry in Russia =

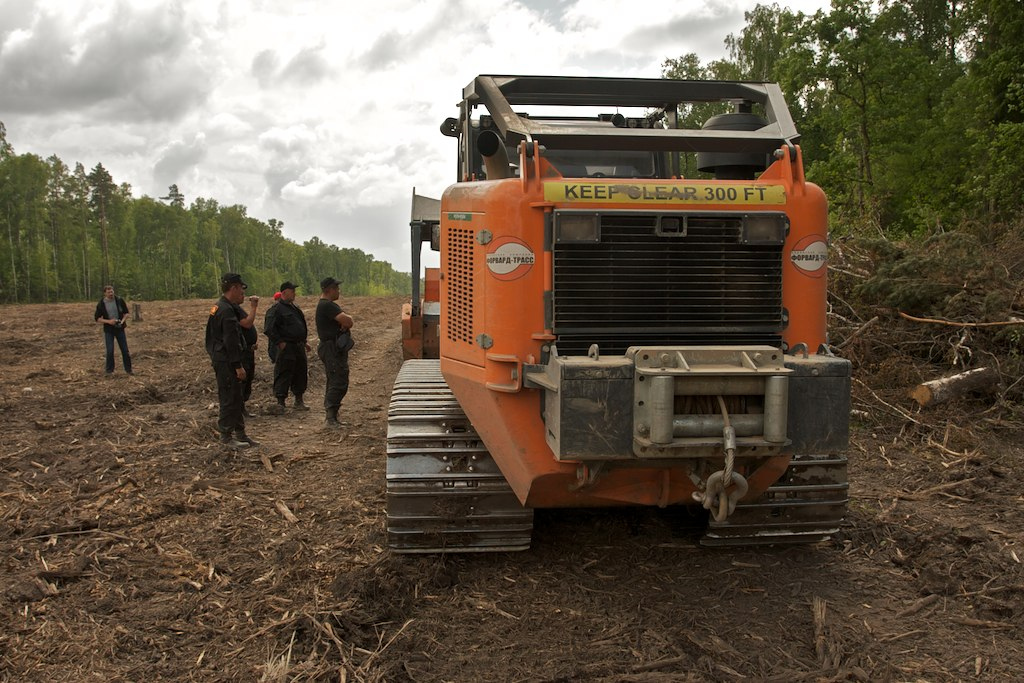
Forestry activity in Khimki Forest near Moscow

Forestry in Russia is a set of industries related to wood harvesting and processing. It is one of the oldest sectors in the country's economy, Russia's timber industry is valued at $20 billion per year, and as of 2022, is the second largest producer of industrial roundwood. Russia has more than a fifth of the world's forests, making it the largest forest country in the world. According to data for 2015, the total forest area has exceeded 885 million hectares (2,190×10^{6} acres), representing 45% of the total area of the country. The stock of wood in the area was 82 billion cubic meters. However in 2023 academics complained that not enough information had been published.

A significant proportion of revenue from the industry is generated by the export of raw materials from sawing logs. For a long time Russia was the main supplier of raw wood material in Europe. However, according to a 2012 study by the Food and Agriculture Organization of the United Nations and the Government of the Russian Federation, the potential of Russian forests is underutilized and Russia's share of the global trade in forest products is less than 4%.

Russia's timber industry sectors, as part of the Russia's total industrial production, are seventh place in terms of production and fifth place in terms of national exports. The main product of the Russia's forest industry is timber, whose share among the total volume of exported timber is approximately 75 - 80%. The logging industry is considered to be the basic direction of the whole forest complex. By the end of the 1980s, the USSR ranked second in the world in the export of wood, second only to the United States. As a result of numerous economic changes throughout the past decade, Russia has moved between 6th and 7th place worldwide in this index.

All data is due to be recorded in the national forest inventory accounting system by 2025.

== Types of forests ==
The Forest Fund of Russia has divided the country's forests into four main groups: waterproof, field, reserve, recreational forests. In reserve areas, workers can only participate in sanitary felling of trees to improve the overall condition of the forest. Forest areas, which allow selective cutting, cannot exceed volume growth for the year. Operating forests are allowed to use clearcutting. Generally speaking, Russian forests are composed mostly of coniferous tree from the following species: pine, spruce, larch, and cedar.

== Sectors included in the Russian timber industry ==
The timber industry as chemical component differs from the others with quite a complicated structure. However, conventionally, all branches of forest complex can be divided into four groups:

- Logging industry, which harvests timber
- Wood industry, which utilizes mechanical and chemical-mechanical treatment and processing of wood, as well as plate, furniture, and lumber production
- Pulp and paper industry, which handles mainly the chemical processing of wood, pulp, paper, and cardboard
- Wood chemical industry, which produces charcoal, rosin, and turpentine.

== International involvement ==
The bulk of Russian lumber is shipped to China, Egypt, Uzbekistan, Japan and Iran. In the 1st quarter of 2010, there was an increase in the volume of lumber shipments to Europe, China, Middle East and North Africa. Prices generally reduced for lumber worldwide, but raised in China and other CIS countries. At the same time, China took the largest share in exports at 19%. The leaders in the volume of exports of sawed timber in the 1st quarter were: Lesosibirsk LDK (Segezha Group), Ust-Ilim Timber Processing Plant, Novoyeniseysk LHK, "Sawmill-25", and "Svir Timber".

The Russian forest industry also plays a big role in the economies of the Northern European countries as well, specifically in the vast territories of Eastern and Western Siberia and the Far East's timber, inferior fuel, and metallurgy industries.

== History of the industry ==
=== 2008 decrease in production ===
According to analyst group of companies called the Lesprom Network, the Russian government's decision to raise export duty on roundwood in July 2007 by 20% and April 2008 by 25% resulted in a decrease in the competitiveness of Russian companies as exporters in the world markets. In the second half of 2008, amid the global economic crisis, the volume of construction fell sharply in Japan, China, and Western Europe, and as a result, production volumes also substantially declined in the major economic sectors that consume the wood. In 2008, the volume of timber in Russia decreased by 14.4% compared to the volume of the year before. Production growth in the area of wood specifically was 1.4%; in the pulp and paper production industry, the production growth for publishing and printing was only 0.8%.

The net profit of the Russian forest industry companies in 2008 fell sharply, evidenced by an annual ranking of the 50 largest companies data published by the magazine "Forest Industry". Total revenue companies included in the Lesnaya Industriya's Top 50 "Forest Industry" amounted to 216.34 billion rubles ($2.93 billion USD). The 10 largest companies accounted for more than 70% of total revenue, with the total net profit of the top 50 companies amounting to 6.26 billion rubles ($84.8 million USD). The share of companies that engaged exclusively in the processing of wood without pulp and paper production accounted for slightly more than 27% of total revenue, while the total net profit from these industries was around 26.8%.

=== Aftermath and recovery ===
Following the results of 2008, the average profitability ratio of Top 50 companies decreased to 0.7%, compared to 9.0% in the previous year. Woodworking companies’ profitability was slightly higher than that of pulp and paper companies (5.7% and 4.9% respectively), and only four of the Top 50 companies managed to reach a double-digit profitability ratio in 2008.

Zelenodolskiy plywood plant had the highest profitability ratio (17%) in 2008. The fastest-growing forest industry company in Russia was United Panel Group, whose revenue was 3.04 billion roubles ($41.3 million USD), up 89.5%. Ilim Group gained the largest net benefit in 2008 with a revenue of 1.67 billion roubles ($22.7 million USD) and was also listed in the Top 50 forest industry companies as having the largest revenue overall, at 37.92 billion roubles ($515 million USD). The Top 50 Russian Forest Industry rating is prepared and published by Lesnaya Industriya magazine on the base of companies’ accounting reporting and data provided by the companies.

=== Other reasons for stunted growth ===
In Russia, there is no private ownership of forest land, which has been replaced by long-term leases of forest land for recreational and logging purposes. Comparatively, the US management of forest land allows for big business volume of more than $500 billion revenue from 500 million acres (2,000,000 km^{2}) of forest land. About 53% of this land belongs to private owners who are not manufacturers. The remaining 30% of the land is in the public domain, 4% is owned by industrialists, and 8% is owned by financial investors.

In addition to country-specific factors, there are common features of development in the industry, such as increases in the market share of goods, substitutes, and a reduced share of wood and paper products in general. For example, the popularity of plastic packaging has reduced the consumption of paper, and the development of the internet has led to a reduction in the consumption of newsprint.

== Composition of the industry ==
=== Lumber, pulp and paper ===
In connection with the declared policy of the Russian government to reduce the export of raw timber, companies are starting to increase the export of sawed timber. In the 1st quarter of 2010, the volume of exports of softwood lumber from Russia increased by 11% and export prices increased by 6%, as offered by the results of a published analytical service called Lesprom Network who handles export markets research. Another export to factor is pulp and paper. The two biggest destinations for Russia's export of pulp and paper are Northern Europe and Eastern Siberia.

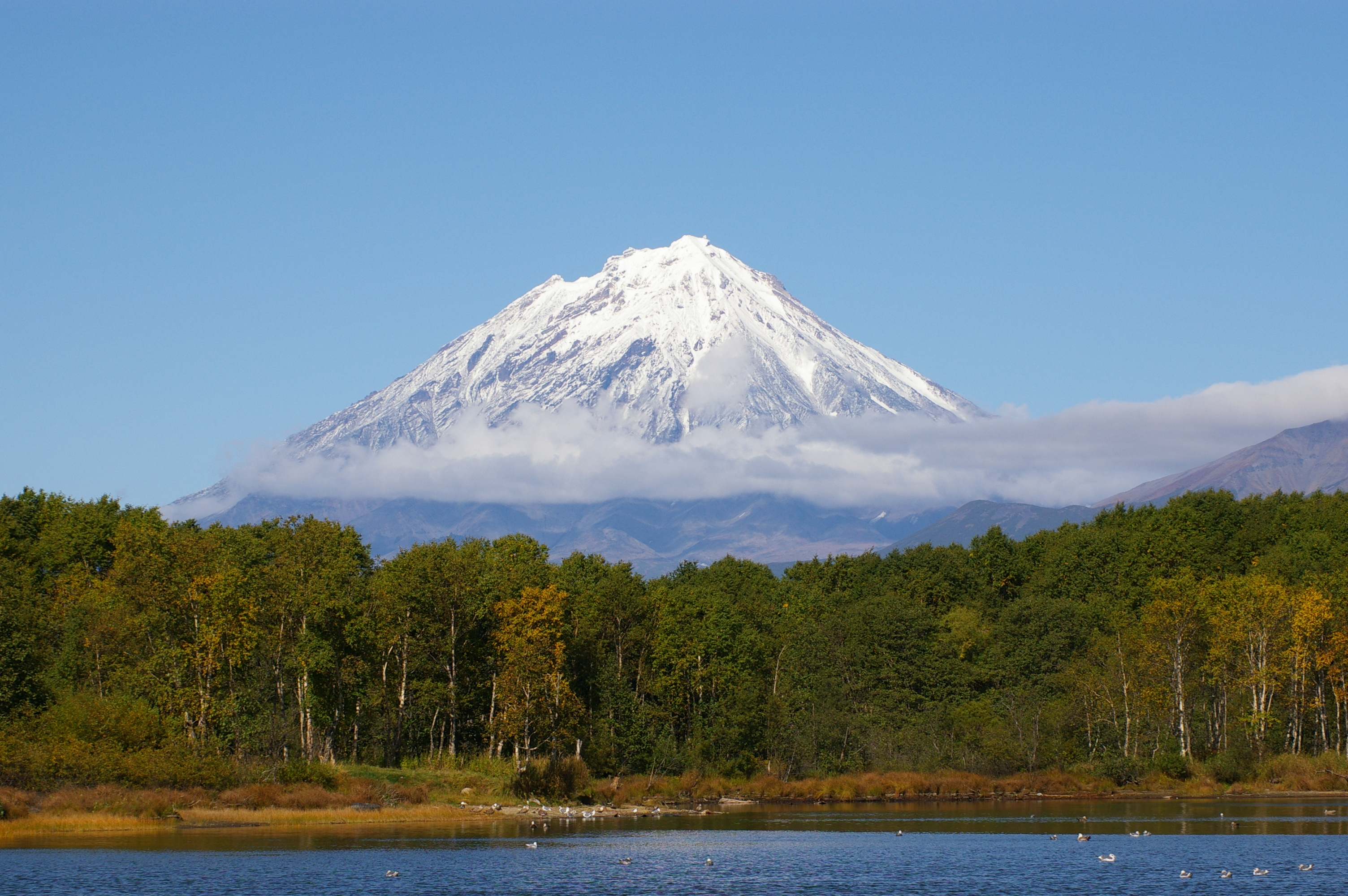
Taiga in Kamchatka Krai, with Koryaksky volcano in the distance.

=== Biofuels ===
In Russia, the development of the biofuel sector is regulated by the state program. The goal of the program prioritizes "energy saving and energy efficiency for the period up to 2020," with goals for saving energy that stretch as far as 2030 in scope. However, as noted in the journal article "Forest Industry", these goals are not sufficiently clear in the draft. According to these documents, by 2020, 4.5% of electricity in Russia must be made with the use of alternative sources, those being not consisting of lumber related products. Comparatively, in Norway, the figure for alternatively-sourced electricity is 67.5%, and in Sweden and Latvia the figures are 50% and 40% respectively.

Biofuel consumption grows in Central Europe as Germany, Netherlands, and United Kingdom increase the import of pellets. Brazil, Canada and the United States also have large reserves of biofuel feedstocks, making them direct competitors with Russia in the market of exporting wood pellets to Europe.

=== Prominent venues for wood and timber production ===
The most prominent venues for the production of raw wood materials in Russia are Arkhangelsk, Syktyvkar, Krasnoyarsk, Bratsk and Ust-Ilimsk, Irkutsk, Svetogorsk, Moscow, Balakhna (Nizhniy Novgorod region), Astrakhan (as a raw material - cane), Rostov-on-Don (as a raw material - cane), Amursk, Perm, and Solikamsk. The largest enterprises of the timber industry, combining all stages of the processing timber, are Arkhangelsk, Syktyvkar, Asino (Tomsk.), Krasnoyarsk, Lesosibirsk (Krasnoyarsk region), Bratsk and Ust-Ilim, Komsomolsk-on-Amur. This collection of groups is called the timber industry complex.

== Problems with the industry ==
Annually, the forest industry harvests about 0.5 billion tons of biomass, of which only 25% is put towards production. Many members of the industry do not use the needles, bark, or twigs, as using these components would be considered an irrational use of extracted raw materials. The finished product, when converted, contributes to only about 11% of the feedstock. In addition, according to the opinions the Forest Club participants at St. Petersburg International Forestry Forum in autumn of 2011, the Russian timber industry faces the following problems:

- The increase in fuel prices
- Problems of transport and logistics, including the commercialization of transport companies that serve the forest industry, which causes an increase in the final cost of forestry-related products
- Problems of legal regulation regarding the organization of auctions that offer the right to lease forest areas
- The lack of a coherent framework to regulate what governs economic relations with foreign countries
- The cost of cleaning systems for water and air resources used in the timber industry
- The absence of a competent methodology for selecting investment projects in the timber industry.

== See also ==
- Deforestation in Russia
- Temperate rainforests of the Russian Far East
- Forest cover by federal subject in Russia
