= Forest cover =

Amount of land area covered by forest

Forest cover is the amount of trees that cover a particular area of land. It may be measured as relative (in percent) or absolute (in square kilometres/square miles). Nearly a third of the world's land surface is covered with forest, with closed-canopy forest accounting for 4 - 5 billion hectares of land. Forests provide many ecosystem services that humans and animals cannot survive without, but anthropogenic actions and climate change are threatening global forest cover in potentially irreversible ways.

== Global pattern ==
=== Forest cover by the numbers ===
According to the FAO's Global Forest Resources Assessment 2020, the world has a total forest area of 4.06 billion hectares (10.0 billion acres), which is 31% of the total land area. More than one-third of the world's forest cover is primary forest: naturally regenerated forests with native species and no visible indication of human activity.

More than half (54%) of the world's forests are found in only five countries (Brazil, Canada, China, Russia and the United States). Countries with the highest share of forest area in land area are located in all regions of the world, mostly the tropical ones; they also tend to be low- and middle-income countries. In 2022, forest covered 95% of the land area in Suriname, 94% in Guyana and 92% in the Federated States of Micronesia. Russia has the largest forest area in the world, at 815 million hectares (a fifth of global forest cover). The other four countries all house more than 100 million hectares of forest each. The small African nation of Gabon, while only containing 0.58% of the world's forest cover, has the largest forest-to-land ratio of any country (91.3%).

=== Variation in forest ecosystems ===
Forests are found throughout the world on a spatial scale determined by temperature and precipitation. There are four types of forest biomes: tropical, temperate, subtropical, and boreal. Most of the world's forest cover (45%) is found in the tropics, which is defined by high temperature and humidity. The boreal zone, which includes Russia and the Arctic, contains the second largest amount of forest (33%). The temperate/subtropical zone, located between the tropical and the boreal, contains 25%. Almost half of global forest cover (49%) is relatively continuous, while 9% is found in fragments with little to no connectivity. Roughly 80% of the world's forest area is found in patches larger than 1 million hectares (2.5 million acres). The remaining 20% is located in more than 34 million patches across the world with the vast majority being less than 1,000 hectares (2,500 acres) in size. Tropical rainforests and boreal coniferous forests are the least fragmented, whereas subtropical dry forest and temperate oceanic forests are among the most fragmented.

== Ecological impacts ==
=== Benefits of forest cover ===
The World Health Organization has compiled a list of ecological goods and services that depend on forests and without which humans could not survive, including: flood and drought mitigation, water purification, erosion control, and disease reduction. Tropical forests especially act as one of the world's largest carbon sinks, accumulating atmospheric carbon dioxide during photosynthesis and thus mitigating climate change. Maintaining the size, continuity, and biodiversity of the world's forests is crucial for human health and prosperity. However, forest cover is severely threatened by deforestation, as a direct consequence of agriculture, grazing, and mining. Since the onset of agriculture (about 12,000 years ago), the number of trees worldwide has dropped by 46%. Since 1990, Earth has lost 178,000,000 hectares (439,847,597.01 acres) of forest (an area roughly the size of Libya).

=== Forest cover remediation tactics ===
Although global forest area is decreasing, the rates have slowed down. In the 1990s, 7,800,000 hectares (19,274,219.75 acres) of area per year, but in the following decade, this rate slowed to 5,200,000 million hectares (12,849,479.84 acres), and during the decade after that, it shrank even further (down to 4,700,000 million). This pattern is due to the regeneration abilities of forests, as well as a conscious global effort to reduce deforestation. Plantation forests are one method of reforestation/afforestation that has become increasingly popular since the 1990s. Intensively planned to be biodiverse and well-managed, these forests exist for the purpose of regenerating the global forest cover.

== See also ==
- By country:
  - Forest cover by state in the United States
  - Forest cover by province or territory in Canada
  - Forest cover by state in India
  - Forest cover by federal subject in Russia
- List of countries by forest area
- Category:Forests by country
- Deforestation by region
- Cover crop
- Plant cover
- Continuous cover forestry
- Sustainable forestry

== Sources ==
This article incorporates text from a free content work. Licensed under CC BY-SA 3.0 (license statement/permission). Text taken from Global Forest Resources Assessment 2020 Key findings, FAO, FAO.

This article incorporates text from a free content work. Licensed under CC BY-SA 3.0 (license statement/permission). Text taken from The State of the World's Forests 2020. In brief – Forests, biodiversity and people, FAO & UNEP, FAO & UNEP.
