= List of countries by forest area =

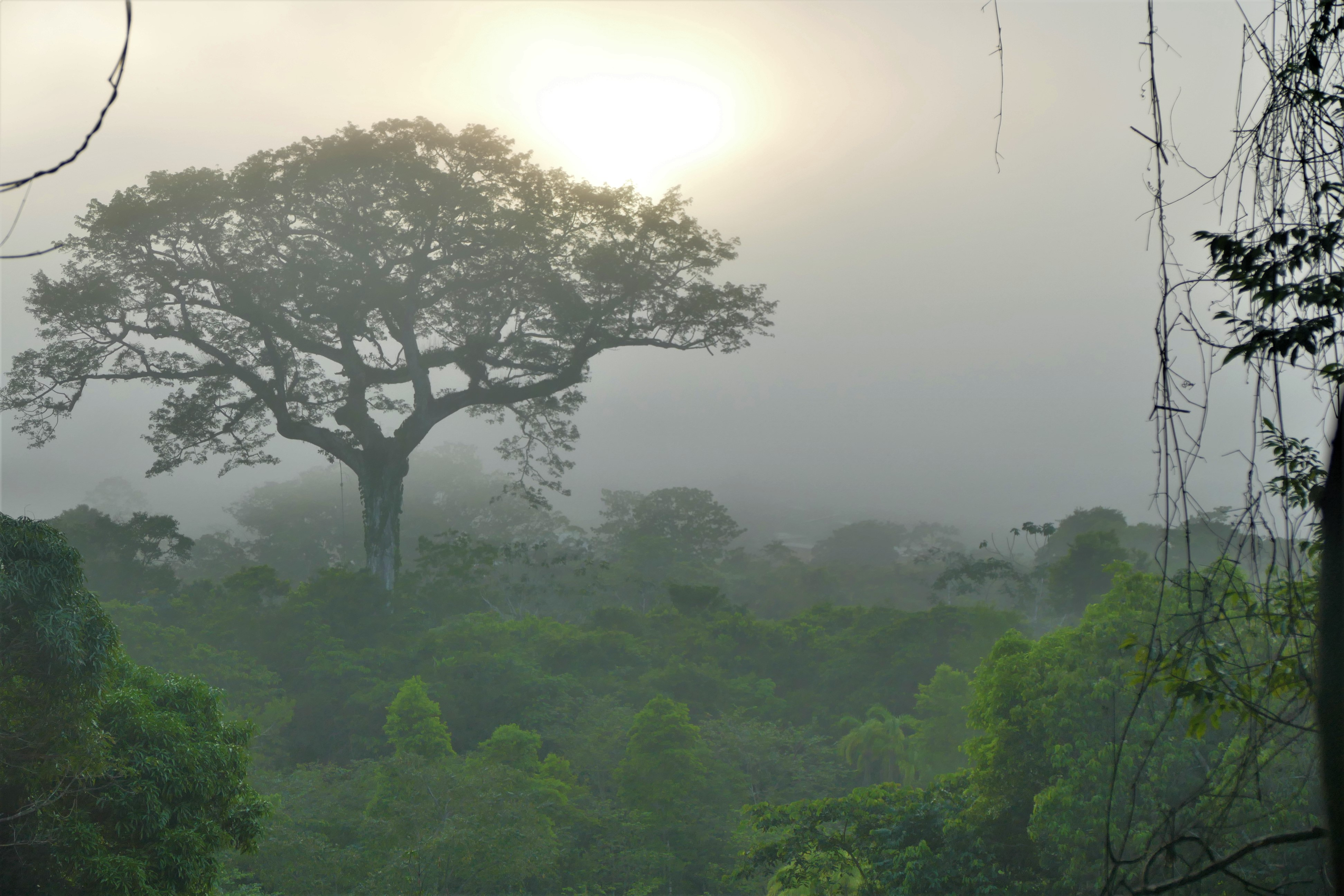
Guiana Amazonian Park in French Guiana

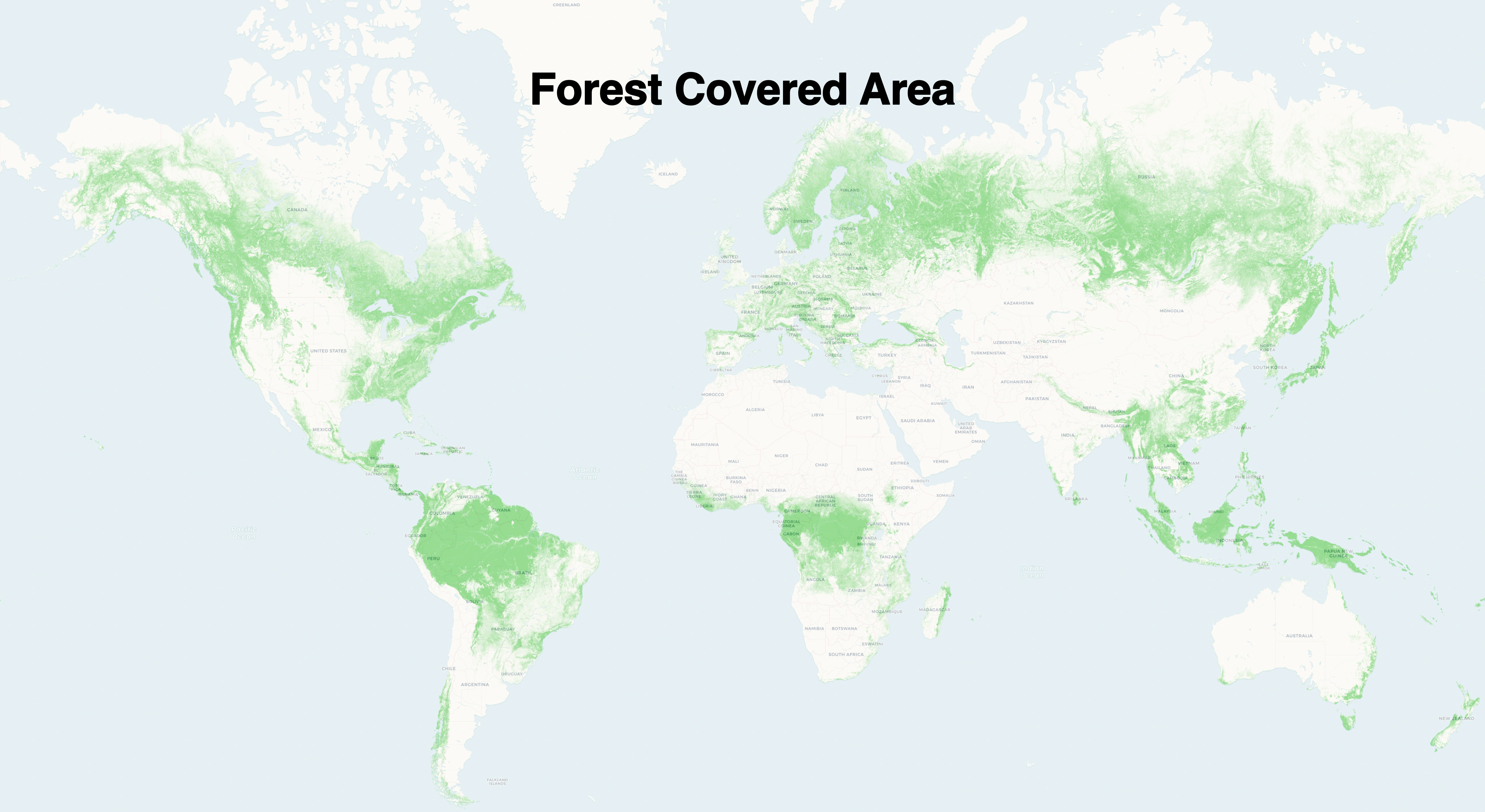
Forest covered area

This is a list of countries and territories of the world according to the total area covered by forests, based on data published by the Food and Agriculture Organization of the United Nations (FAO). In 2010, the world had 3.92 billion hectares (ha) of tree cover, extending over 30% of its land area.

In 2020, the world had a total forest area of 4.06 billion ha, which was 31 percent of the total land area. This area is equivalent to 0.52 ha per person – although forests are not distributed equally among the world's people or geographically. The tropical domain has the largest proportion of the world's forests (45 percent), followed by the boreal, temperate and subtropical domains. More than half (54 percent) of the world's forests is in only five countries – the Russian Federation (20.1%), Brazil (12.2%), Canada (8.6%), the United States of America (7.6%) and China (5.4%).

Many of the world's forests are being damaged and degraded or are disappearing altogether. Their capacity to provide tangible goods, such as fiber, food, and medicines, as well as essential ecological services, including habitat for biodiversity, carbon storage, and moderation of freshwater flows, is under greater threat than ever before. According to World Resource Institute in Washington, between 2000 and 2020 the world lost 101 million hectares (Mha) of tree cover, mostly tropical and subtropical forests (92%). The FAO is compiling a new global assessment due to be published in 2025.

== Planet, continents and regions ==
All areas are given in units of 1000 hectares (approximately 2,500 acres; 3.9 sq mi). Source: Food and Agriculture Organization

Region	1990		2000		2010		2020	
Region	ha	acre	ha	acre	ha	acre	ha	acre
World	4,236,433	10,468,450	4,158,050	10,274,750	4,106,317	10,146,950	4,058,931	10,029,850
Asia (including Russia)	1,394,343	3,445,500	1,396,679	3,451,250	1,426,096	3,523,950	1,437,999	3,553,350
South America	973,666	2,406,000	922,645	2,279,900	870,154	2,150,200	844,186	2,086,050
North America and Central America	755,279	1,866,350	752,349	1,859,100	754,190	1,863,650	752,710	1,860,000
Africa	742,801	1,835,500	710,049	1,754,550	676,015	1,670,450	636,639	1,573,150
Europe (excluding Russia)	185,369	458,050	192,999	476,900	198,846	491,350	202,149	499,500
Oceania	184,974	457,100	183,328	453,000	181,015	447,300	185,248	457,750

== Countries and territories ==
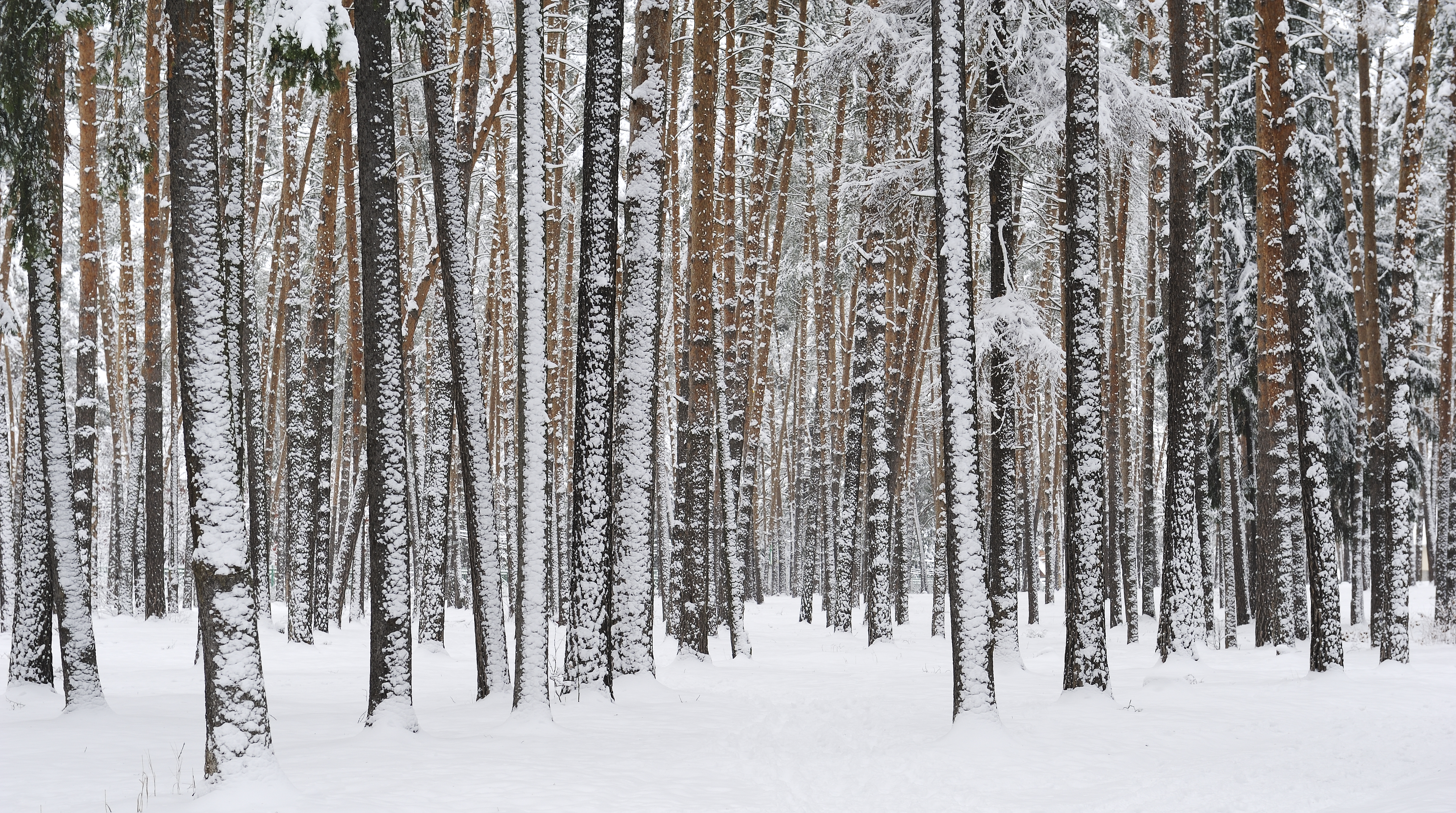
Russia has more total forested land than any other country

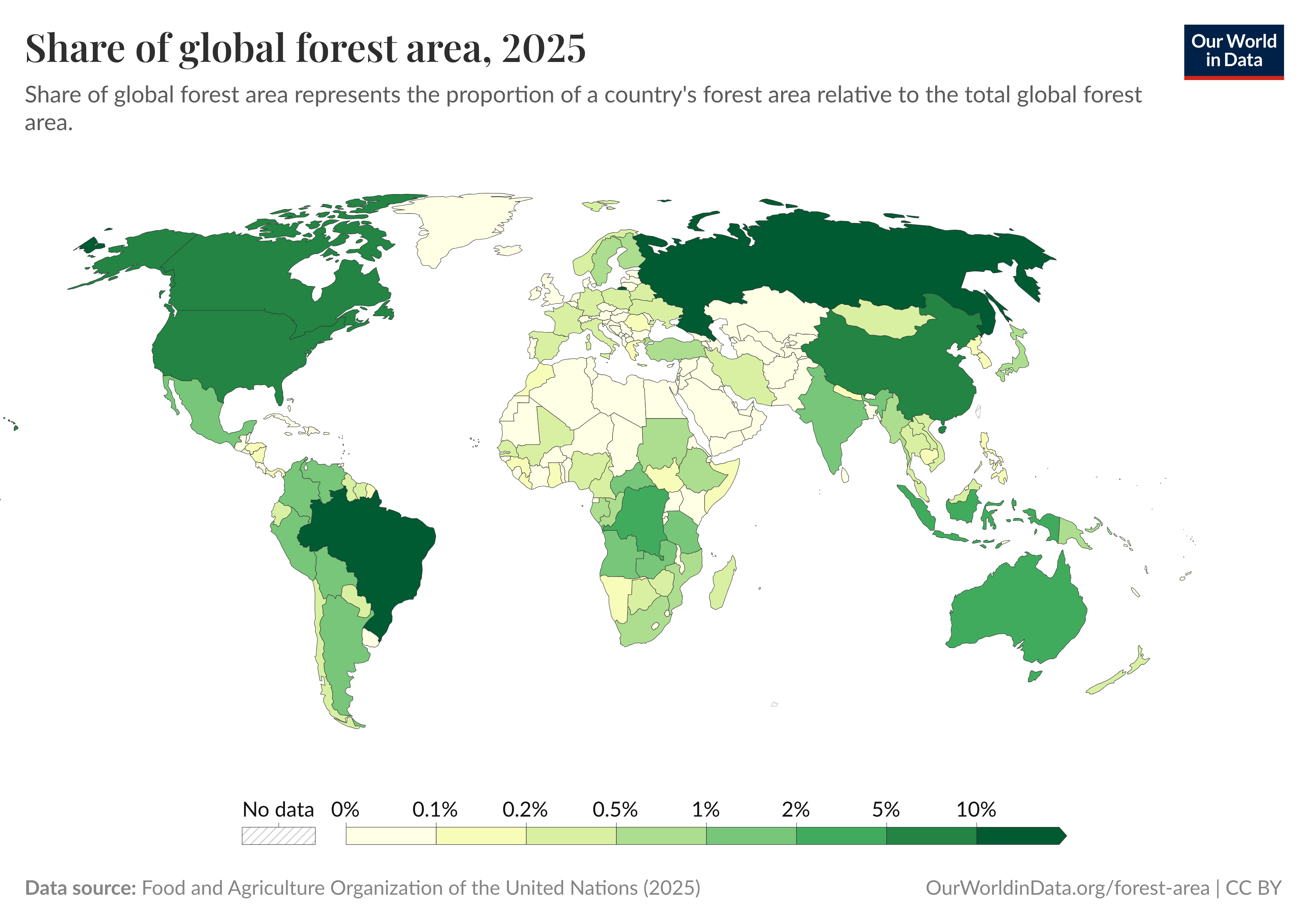
Share of global forest in each country

Data are for the year 2022 and are from the Food and Agriculture Organization of the United Nations.

Location	Land		Forest		% forest
Location	km^{2}	sq mi	km^{2}	sq mi	% forest
World	139,539,828	53,876,629	42,726,835	16,496,923	30.6%
French Guiana	82,810	31,970	79,960	30,870	96.6%
Suriname	160,508	61,972	151,718	58,579	94.5%
Guyana	196,850	76,000	183,969	71,031	93.5%
Micronesia	700	270	645	249	92.1%
Gabon	257,670	99,490	235,068	90,760	91.2%
Palau	460	180	416	161	90.4%
Solomon Islands	27,990	10,810	25,215	9,736	90.1%
Equatorial Guinea	28,050	10,830	24,317	9,389	86.7%
American Samoa	200	77	171	66	85.4%
Papua New Guinea	452,860	174,850	357,887	138,181	79.0%
Liberia	96,320	37,190	75,569	29,177	78.5%
Pitcairn	47	18	35	14	74.5%
Finland	303,948	117,355	224,090	86,520	73.7%
Seychelles	460	180	337	130	73.3%
Saint Vincent and the Grenadines	390	150	285	110	73.2%
Niue	260	100	189	73	72.7%
Brunei	5,270	2,030	3,800	1,500	72.1%
Laos	230,800	89,100	165,265	63,809	71.6%
Bhutan	38,140	14,730	27,290	10,540	71.6%
Guinea-Bissau	28,120	10,860	19,631	7,580	69.8%
Sweden	407,280	157,250	279,800	108,000	68.7%
Japan	364,500	140,700	249,350	96,270	68.4%
Cook Islands	240	93	156	60	65.0%
South Korea	97,600	37,700	62,670	24,200	64.2%
Congo	341,500	131,900	219,160	84,620	64.2%
Dominica	750	290	479	185	63.8%
Fiji	18,270	7,050	11,534	4,453	63.1%
Timor-Leste	14,870	5,740	9,183	3,546	61.8%
Montenegro	13,450	5,190	8,270	3,190	61.5%
Slovenia	20,136	7,775	12,338	4,764	61.3%
Anguilla	90	35	55	21	61.1%
Costa Rica	51,060	19,710	30,676	11,844	60.1%
Zambia	743,390	287,020	444,376	171,575	59.8%
Brazil	8,358,140	3,227,100	4,941,960	1,908,100	59.1%
Malaysia	328,550	126,850	190,137	73,412	57.9%
Samoa	2,780	1,070	1,607	620	57.8%
US Virgin Islands	350	140	202	78	57.7%
Estonia	42,730	16,500	24,384	9,415	57.1%
Panama	74,180	28,640	41,910	16,180	56.5%
Honduras	111,890	43,200	63,174	24,392	56.5%
Peru	1,280,000	490,000	719,847	277,934	56.2%
Puerto Rico	8,870	3,420	4,973	1,920	56.1%
Jamaica	10,830	4,180	6,047	2,335	55.8%
Belize	22,810	8,810	12,547	4,844	55.0%
Latvia	62,230	24,030	34,185	13,199	54.9%
Democratic Republic of the Congo	2,267,050	875,310	1,239,525	478,583	54.7%
Northern Mariana Islands	460	180	244	94	53.0%
Colombia	1,109,500	428,400	587,433	226,809	52.9%
Sao Tome and Principe	960	370	507	196	52.8%
Cayman Islands	240	93	126	49	52.7%
Angola	1,246,700	481,400	654,973	252,886	52.5%
Venezuela	882,050	340,560	461,268	178,097	52.3%
Marshall Islands	180	69	94	36	52.2%
Grenada	340	130	177	68	52.1%
Guam	540	210	280	110	51.9%
Bahamas	10,010	3,860	5,099	1,969	50.9%
Tanzania	885,800	342,000	448,070	173,000	50.6%
Ecuador	248,360	95,890	123,693	47,758	49.8%
Russia	16,376,870	6,323,140	8,153,116	3,147,936	49.8%
North Korea	120,410	46,490	59,876	23,118	49.7%
Martinique	1,060	410	527	203	49.7%
Indonesia	1,892,555	730,720	909,221	351,052	48.0%
Austria	82,520	31,860	38,955	15,041	47.2%
Vietnam	313,429	121,016	147,949	57,123	47.2%
Bolivia	1,083,300	418,300	504,164	194,659	46.5%
Mozambique	786,380	303,620	362,673	140,029	46.1%
New Caledonia	18,280	7,060	8,378	3,235	45.8%
Zimbabwe	386,850	149,360	173,524	66,998	44.9%
Dominican Republic	48,198	18,609	21,603	8,341	44.8%
Guadeloupe	1,620	630	718	277	44.3%
Trinidad and Tobago	5,130	1,980	2,274	878	44.3%
Cambodia	176,520	68,150	77,570	29,950	43.9%
Belarus	202,990	78,370	87,966	33,964	43.3%
French Polynesia	3,471	1,340	1,495	577	43.1%
Myanmar	652,670	252,000	279,645	107,972	42.8%
Cameroon	472,710	182,510	202,285	78,103	42.8%
Bosnia and Herzegovina	51,200	19,800	21,879	8,448	42.7%
Saint Kitts and Nevis	260	100	110	42	42.3%
Liechtenstein	160	62	67	26	41.9%
Wallis and Futuna Islands	140	54	58	22	41.6%
Nepal	143,350	55,350	59,620	23,020	41.6%
Senegal	192,530	74,340	79,882	30,843	41.5%
Georgia	69,490	26,830	28,224	10,897	40.6%
Slovakia	48,080	18,560	19,259	7,436	40.1%
North Macedonia	25,220	9,740	10,015	3,867	39.7%
Réunion	2,510	970	994	384	39.6%
Canada	8,788,700	3,393,300	3,468,541	1,339,211	39.5%
Paraguay	396,012	152,901	155,436	60,014	39.3%
Thailand	510,890	197,260	198,010	76,450	38.8%
New Zealand	263,310	101,660	99,319	38,347	37.7%
Mayotte	366	141	138	53	37.7%
Spain	499,714	192,941	185,808	71,741	37.2%
Vanuatu	12,190	4,710	4,423	1,708	36.3%
Portugal	91,606	35,369	33,120	12,790	36.2%
Bulgaria	108,560	41,920	39,190	15,130	36.1%
Central African Republic	622,980	240,530	222,430	85,880	35.7%
Lithuania	62,604	24,172	22,039	8,509	35.2%
Ghana	227,533	87,851	80,002	30,889	35.2%
Croatia	55,960	21,610	19,441	7,506	34.7%
Czech Republic	77,172	29,796	26,807	10,350	34.7%
Sierra Leone	72,180	27,870	24,954	9,635	34.6%
Luxembourg	2,574	994	887	342	34.5%
Sri Lanka	61,860	23,880	21,067	8,134	34.1%
Saint Lucia	610	240	208	80	34.0%
Andorra	470	180	160	62	34.0%
United States	9,147,420	3,531,840	3,097,950	1,196,130	33.9%
Mexico	1,943,950	750,560	654,365	252,652	33.7%
Norway	364,270	140,650	121,956	47,087	33.5%
Tuvalu	30	12	10	3.9	33.3%
Italy	295,720	114,180	96,738	37,351	32.7%
Guatemala	107,160	41,370	35,046	13,531	32.7%
Germany	349,360	134,890	114,190	44,090	32.7%
Serbia	84,090	32,470	27,233	10,515	32.4%
Switzerland	39,510	15,250	12,760	4,930	32.3%
France	547,557	211,413	174,198	67,258	31.8%
Cuba	103,800	40,100	32,420	12,520	31.2%
Poland	306,090	118,180	95,070	36,710	31.1%
Greece	128,900	49,800	39,018	15,065	30.3%
Romania	230,080	88,830	69,291	26,753	30.1%
Turkey	769,630	297,160	225,324	86,998	29.3%
Eswatini	17,200	6,600	5,000	1,900	29.1%
Albania	27,400	10,600	7,889	3,046	28.8%
El Salvador	20,720	8,000	5,749	2,220	27.7%
Benin	112,760	43,540	30,352	11,719	26.9%
Nicaragua	120,340	46,460	32,075	12,384	26.7%
Botswana	566,730	218,820	150,181	57,985	26.5%
Montserrat	100	39	25	9.7	25.0%
Guinea	245,720	94,870	61,090	23,590	24.9%
Chile	743,532	287,079	184,565	71,261	24.8%
Saint Martin	50	19	12	4.6	24.8%
India	2,973,190	1,147,960	726,928	280,668	24.4%
Philippines	298,170	115,120	72,584	28,025	24.3%
British Virgin Islands	150	58	36	14	24.1%
China	9,388,210	3,624,810	2,237,373	863,855	23.8%
Nigeria	910,770	351,650	213,004	82,241	23.4%
Malawi	94,280	36,400	21,577	8,331	22.9%
The Gambia	10,120	3,910	2,312	893	22.8%
Belgium	30,494	11,774	6,893	2,661	22.6%
Hungary	91,260	35,240	20,501	7,915	22.5%
Burkina Faso	273,600	105,600	61,164	23,616	22.4%
Togo	54,390	21,000	12,034	4,646	22.1%
Madagascar	581,800	224,600	124,034	47,890	21.3%
Singapore	718	277	152	59	21.2%
Mauritius	1,997	771	389	150	19.5%
Cyprus	9,240	3,570	1,725	666	18.7%
Bermuda	54	21	10	3.9	18.5%
Antigua and Barbuda	440	170	80	31	18.2%
Australia	7,692,020	2,969,910	1,340,051	517,397	17.4%
Comoros	1,861	719	320	120	17.2%
Ukraine	579,400	223,700	97,020	37,460	16.7%
San Marino	60	23	10	3.9	16.7%
Denmark	40,000	15,000	6,303	2,434	15.8%
Ethiopia	1,128,571	435,744	169,225	65,338	15.0%
Barbados	430	170	63	24	14.7%
Bangladesh	130,170	50,260	18,834	7,272	14.5%
Lebanon	10,230	3,950	1,445	558	14.1%
South Africa	1,213,090	468,380	169,773	65,550	14.0%
Azerbaijan	82,650	31,910	11,548	4,459	14.0%
United Kingdom	241,930	93,410	32,069	12,382	13.3%
Morocco	446,300	172,300	57,634	22,253	12.9%
Tonga	720	280	90	35	12.4%
Haiti	27,560	10,640	3,411	1,317	12.4%
Norfolk Island	40	15	5	1.9	12.3%
Uruguay	175,020	67,580	20,730	8,000	11.8%
Moldova	32,890	12,700	3,865	1,492	11.8%
Armenia	28,470	10,990	3,281	1,267	11.5%
Cape Verde	4,030	1,560	463	179	11.5%
Ireland	68,890	26,600	7,900	3,100	11.5%
South Sudan	631,930	243,990	71,570	27,630	11.3%
Rwanda	24,670	9,530	2,780	1,070	11.3%
Uganda	200,520	77,420	22,554	8,708	11.2%
Turks and Caicos Islands	950	370	105	41	11.1%
Netherlands	33,670	13,000	3,714	1,434	11.0%
Mali	1,220,190	471,120	132,960	51,340	10.9%
Burundi	25,680	9,920	2,796	1,080	10.9%
Sint Maarten	34	13	4	1.5	10.9%
Argentina	2,736,690	1,056,640	283,552	109,480	10.4%
Sudan	1,868,000	721,000	180,152	69,557	9.6%
Somalia	627,340	242,220	58,265	22,496	9.3%
Mongolia	1,557,507	601,357	141,706	54,713	9.1%
Turkmenistan	469,930	181,440	41,270	15,930	8.8%
Eritrea	121,041	46,734	10,489	4,050	8.7%
Saint Barthélemy	20	7.7	2	0.77	8.5%
Uzbekistan	440,652	170,137	37,413	14,445	8.5%
Ivory Coast	318,000	123,000	26,109	10,081	8.2%
Namibia	823,290	317,870	64,969	25,085	7.9%
Kyrgyzstan	191,800	74,100	13,519	5,220	7.0%
Iran	1,622,500	626,500	107,758	41,606	6.6%
Israel	21,640	8,360	1,400	540	6.5%
Kenya	569,140	219,750	36,111	13,943	6.3%
Isle of Man	570	220	35	14	6.1%
Caribbean Netherlands	322	124	19	7.3	5.9%
Channel Islands	198	76	10	3.9	5.2%
Saint Pierre and Miquelon	230	89	12	4.6	5.1%
Saint Helena, Ascension and Tristan da Cunha	390	150	20	7.7	5.1%
Pakistan	770,880	297,640	36,432	14,066	4.7%
Tunisia	155,360	59,980	7,058	2,725	4.5%
United Arab Emirates	71,020	27,420	3,173	1,225	4.5%
Chad	1,259,200	486,200	40,914	15,797	3.2%
Tajikistan	138,790	53,590	4,258	1,644	3.1%
Syria	185,180	71,500	5,221	2,016	2.8%
Maldives	300	120	8	3.1	2.7%
Western Sahara	266,000	103,000	6,650	2,570	2.5%
Aruba	180	69	4	1.5	2.3%
Iraq	434,128	167,618	8,250	3,190	1.9%
Afghanistan	652,230	251,830	12,084	4,666	1.9%
Palestine	6,025	2,326	101	39	1.7%
Kiribati	810	310	12	4.6	1.5%
Malta	320	120	5	1.9	1.4%
Kazakhstan	2,699,700	1,042,400	35,132	13,565	1.3%
Lesotho	30,360	11,720	345	133	1.1%
Jordan	88,794	34,284	975	376	1.1%
Yemen	527,970	203,850	5,490	2,120	1.0%
Bahrain	790	310	7	2.7	0.9%
Niger	1,266,700	489,100	10,549	4,073	0.8%
Algeria	2,381,741	919,595	19,681	7,599	0.8%
Iceland	100,830	38,930	527	203	0.5%
Saudi Arabia	2,149,690	830,000	9,770	3,770	0.5%
Kuwait	17,820	6,880	63	24	0.4%
Mauritania	1,030,700	398,000	3,019	1,166	0.3%
Djibouti	23,180	8,950	60	23	0.3%
Curaçao	444	171	1	0.39	0.2%
Libya	1,759,540	679,360	2,170	840	0.1%
Faroe Islands	1,370	530	1	0.39	0.1%
Egypt	995,450	384,350	450	170	0.0%
Oman	309,500	119,500	24	9.3	0.0%
Greenland	2,166,086	836,330	2	0.77	0.0%
Falkland Islands	12,170	4,700	0	0	0.0%
Gibraltar	10	3.9	0	0	0.0%
Vatican City	0	0	0	0	0.0%
Monaco	2	0.77	0	0	0.0%
Nauru	20	7.7	0	0	0.0%
Qatar	11,490	4,440	0	0	0.0%
Tokelau	10	3.9	0	0	0.0%

== See also ==
- Deforestation by continent
- Forest cover by state and territory in the United States
- Forest cover by state in India
- Forest cover by federal subject in Russia
- Forest cover by province or territory in Canada
- Forest Landscape Integrity Index
- Forest restoration
- Reforestation

== Sources ==
This article incorporates text from "Global Forest Resources Assessment 2020 Key findings" (PDF). FAO. 2020. Licensed under CC BY-SA 3.0. See c:File:Global Forest Resources Assessment 2020 – Key findings.pdf. VRTS ticket # 2020073010003087.

This article incorporates text from a free content work. Licensed under CC BY-SA 3.0 IGO (license statement/permission). Text taken from The State of the World's Forests 2020. Forests, biodiversity and people – In brief, FAO & UNEP, FAO & UNEP.
