= Ecoforestry =

Selection forestry or restoration forestry

Ecoforestry has been defined as restoration or selection forestry. The main idea of ecoforestry is to maintain or restore the forest to standards where the forest may still be harvested for products on a sustainable basis. Ecoforestry is forestry that emphasizes holistic practices which strive to protect and restore ecosystems rather than maximize economic productivity. Sustainability of the forest also comes with uncertainties. There are other factors that may affect the forest furthermore than that of the harvesting. There are internal conditions such as effects of soil compaction, tree damage, disease, fire, and blow down that also directly affect the ecosystem. These factors have to be taken into account when determining the sustainability of a forest. If these factors are added to the harvesting and production that comes out of the forest, then the forest will become less likely to survive, and will then become less sustainable.

Since the forest is considered an ecosystem, it is dependent on all of the living and non-living factors within itself. This is a major part of why the forest needs to be sustainable before it is harvested. For example, a tree, by way of photosynthesis, converts sunlight to sugars for respiration to keep the tree alive. The remains of the converted sugars is left in roots for consumption by the organisms surrounding the tree in the habitat. This shows the productivity of an ecosystem with its inhabitants. Productivity within the ecosystem cannot come to fruition unless the forest is sustainable enough to be harvested. If most individual organisms of the ecosystem vanish, the ecosystem itself is at risk. Once that happens, there is no longer any forest to harvest from. The overall productivity of a system can be found in an equation where the Net Primary Production, or NPP, is equal to the Gross Primary Production, or GPP, minus the Respiration, or R. The formula is the NPP = GPP - R. The NPP is the overall efficiency of the plants in the ecosystem. Through having a constant efficiency in NPP, the ecosystem is then more sustainable. The GPP refers to the rate of energy stored by photosynthesis in plants. The R refers to the maintenance and reproduction of plants from the energy expended.

Ecoforestry has many principles within the existence of itself. It covers sustainable development and the fair harvesting of the organisms living within the forest ecosystem. There have been many proposals of principles outlined for ecoforestry. They are covered over books, articles, and environmental agencies. All of the principles relate to the idea that in ecoforestry, less should be harvested, and diversity must be managed. Through harvesting less, there is enough biomass left in the forest, so that the forest may stay healthy and still stay maintained. It will grow at a sustainable level annually, and thus it will be able to still be harvested the following year. Through management of the diversity, species may cohabitate in an ecosystem where the forest may feed off of other species in its growth and production. The Principles of Ecoforestry may be found below.

== Principles of ecoforestry ==
The principles of ecoforestry are:

Number	Principle
1	One must consider retention. It must be the first consideration in any planned removal of trees from a stand. By placing retention at the beginning of a planned removal, one makes sure that they know what must be left to ensure the protection of such things as rare species, sites of native cultural significance, riparian zones.
2	Riparian zones should not be touched. It is a sensitive area, thus tree removal should not occur there. This protects the water quality. Water quality is protected by not altering the drainage pattern of the zones. No tree removal should take place in the most sensitive areas.
3	The composition and structures should be upheld so that forests may fully function. This may be subject to large old trees, snags, and large fallen trees. These pieces of the ecosystem are upheld through letting them grow and die out into a timber extraction area.
4	When removing trees, the lowest impact should be used. This means not compacting the soil in the forest and building small or no roads if at all possible. This takes away the disturbance that would be done to the foundation of the forest’s grounds.
5	Plan in terms of the needs of the larger watershed. The watershed zone plan designates areas where tree removal is not permitted. It also designates the areas where removal is possible, and the different types of removal available.
6	Avoid the ecologically questionable clear cutting. There are methods for cutting trees to maintain structure, and to allow the trees to cohabitate in a healthy ecosystem.
7	Select trees as candidates for removal by considering how abundant and redundant their structures and functions are to the rest of the forest as a whole, leaving potential wildlife trees (to become snags and coarse woody debris).
8	The forest should be allowed to regenerate trees through the seeds from the trees in the logged areas. This allows tree planting to be taken out of the ecoforestry principles, allowing a natural regeneration.
9	Ecological succession should be kept at all times. This will protect biological diversity. This even means eliminating the process of brush control.
10	No slash burning. Fire may be used as a tool in landscapes that have a history of naturally occurring fires. Although this may be true, fire should still be used with caution.
11	No pesticide use. The forest needs disease, insects, and shrub/herb vegetation. They are essential parts of a fully functioning forest, even though they involve the forest’s decay in some cases. They are natural parts that allow the ecosystem to operate as a whole.
12	Maintain and restore topsoil quality. This can be done through leaving sufficiently coarse and small debris on the forest grounds.
13	Maintain beauty and other natural aesthetic qualities in the visual, sound, and odor landscapes. This includes not taking away the wildlife, the plants, or structural layout of the ecosystem.
14	Always look at the forest as a whole. Each part of the forest contributes to its overall needs and health. That is how the forest would have survived without human interference.
15	Rely more on people and markets. Use accounting and budgeting as a solution to rely less on the destruction or harvesting from the forests.
16	Don’t do wrong. If it feels wrong, then it is probably wrong. Don’t allow ignorance to persevere. Recognize that the ecosystem needs tending to. If the forest is not preserved, then it cannot be harvested forever.

== Analog forestry ==
Analog forestry is an approach to ecosystem restoration that considers the process of forest formation and the functioning of forest services to be critical in establishing a sustainable ecosystem characterised by a high biodiversity to biomass ratio. Analogue forestry uses a synthesis of traditional and scientific knowledge to optimize the productive potential of the restoration design rather than maximise the production of one crop, and maximise ecosystem services by increasing the volumetric mass of the photosynthetic component.

Analogue forestry draws design input not only from traditional models but also from the natural forest successional dynamics. When an ecosystem is designed to be analogous to the indigenous climax state, the efficiency and dynamics of the natural processes can be replicated. These quasi-natural forests are designed to mimic the structural and functional aspects of indigenous forests and are referred to as analog forests. In addition to their ecological characteristics, analog forests are also designed to provide economic benefits. However, it is not until all the ecological requirements of the location are satisfied that economic values of species are considered. Therefore, an analog forest may comprise natural and exotic species in any proportion, the contribution to structure and function being the overriding factor that determines its use.

The theoretical underpinnings began in 1978 in San Diego and Guatemala. It was first implemented in Sri Lanka around 1981 by Ranil Senanayake as an alternative to monocultures of Pinus and Eucalyptus and has spread to India, Vietnam, Philippines, Australia, Peru, Ecuador, Colombia, Brazil, Costa Rica, Dominican Republic, Honduras, Mexico, Canada, Kenya and Zimbabwe at present.

The International Analog Forestry Network (IAFN) is hosted in Costa Rica.

Analog forestry is a system of silviculture that seeks to design, plan and manage ecosystems dominated by woody perennials. It has been primarily employed in tropical or subtropical areas, but can be used in temperate areas too. The design seeks to mimic the architectural structure and ecological function of the preexisting climax vegetation of the area, and can be designed to provide economic, social and environmental benefits.

Analog forestry always considers the inclusion of non-crop native species to be considered in the design and thus addresses the inclusion of native biodiversity in the design. As analog forestry also requires the inclusion of long-lived species of trees in the design it has the capacity to sequester carbon for a longer time than plantation forestry. Analogue forestry has the potential to produce very high values of photosynthetic biomass as its design calls for the inclusion of all the growth forms that occupy the three-dimensional space of the mature indigenous forest. By including many species of crops in one area analog forestry helps spread the risk of market failure on a single crop.

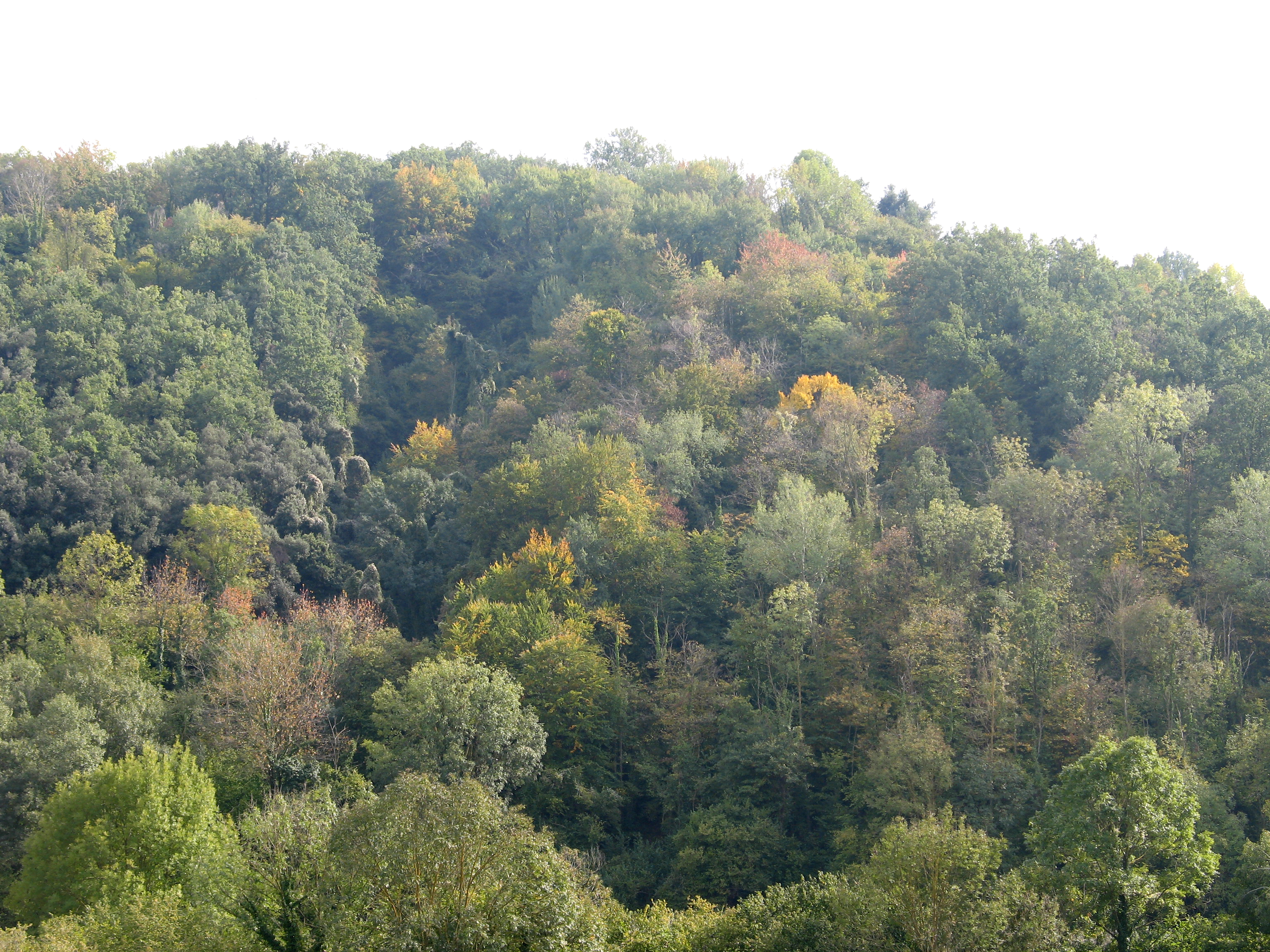
Mixed and irregular deciduous forest in Catalonia

== Close to nature forestry ==
Close to nature forestry is a forest management approach treating forest as an ecological system (ecosystem) performing multiple functions. It is developing in the peri-alpine countries of Europe (such as Switzerland, France, Germany and Slovenia) for more than 70 years, based on certain sustainable forest management practices from the late 19th century. Close to nature silviculture tries to achieve the management objectives with minimum necessary human intervention aimed at accelerating the processes that nature would do by itself more slowly. It works with natural populations of trees, ongoing processes and existing structures using cognitive approach, as in the case of so called (individual or group) selection forest (German: Plenterwald) or other types of uneven-aged forests. Its theory and practice takes forest as a self regulating ecosystem and manages it as such.

It aims at overcoming the divorce between forester and ecologist. As an important consequence, it concludes that if properly applied, it would render the segregation of forest lands into "productive" and "protected" unnecessary.

=== History ===
==== Europe ====
The Arbeitsgemeinschaft für Naturgemässe Waldwirtschaft (ANW) (German: Working Group for the Close to Nature Forestry) was established in Germany in 1950. In recent years this association has increased a lot its membership. The main reasons being the increase of ecological consciousness, the growing demand for forest products or services other than wood, the damages suffered by regular forest stands, the forest death fear. Another term often used to describe a close to nature approach to forest management, especially in Britain and Ireland, is Continuous Cover Forestry.

Because of a 1948 forest law that put a ban on clear-cutting, Slovenia has many forests managed according to the principles of close to nature forestry. In 1989 ANW promoted a meeting at Robanov Kot in Slovenia, in the Julian Alps, and the Pro Silva organization was created, with representatives of 10 countries. At present the organization headquarters are in the French region of Alsace.

==== North America ====
In the United States, professor Thomas J. McEvoy has published the book Positive Impact Forestry, which recommends forestry practices similar to those of the "close to nature" movement. He thinks that the precursors of this type of forestry are to be found in Europe, mainly in Germany, and particularly makes mention of Heinrich Cotta, and his famous Cotta's Preface, which highlighted the importance that the study and understanding of nature should have for the foresters. As a more immediate precursor he makes reference to American forester and ecologist Aldo Leopold.

The Ecoforestry Institute consists on educational, non profit and non governmental organizations operating in US and Canada. They propose a forestry based on ecological principles, very similar to those of Pro Silva.

=== Forest management/ecosystem management ===
The close to nature approach intends to bridge the discrepancies, or even antagonisms between the silvicultural and ecological visions on the single reality of forest, considering the forest as an ecological system that produces wood. The sought after solution is not to segregate the territory into areas devoted to either forestry or ecology, but to integrate all functions.

=== Objective ===
The management has to obtain healthy and stable forest systems that produce wood with a minimum human intervention. The products to obtain, other than wood, are fauna habitats, biodiversity, recreational, aesthetics, and water management. The human action has the object of accelerating natural processes, but not substitute them.

=== Silvicultural models ===
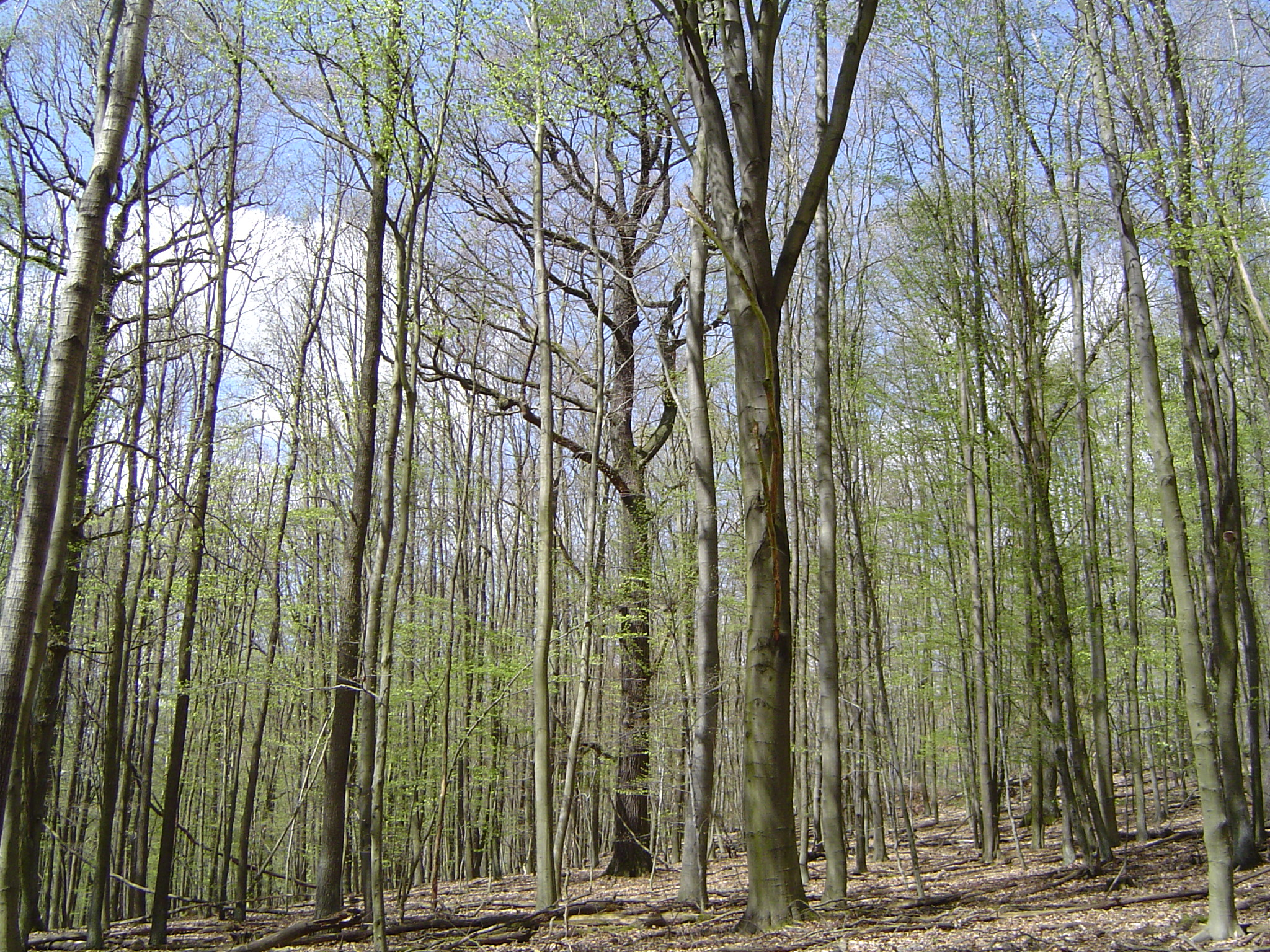
Forest with irregular structure and mixed composition, in NE Germany.

Pro Silva recommends to use the uneven-aged forest system, in which the ages, and consequently sizes, of trees in a forest are different. It has the advantage to offer a stable structure regarding natural disasters and plagues, and is very adequate for fauna habitat and biodiversity promotion. It provides a better soil protection, since there is a permanent tree cover.

McEvoy considers that in spite of being the most close to nature system, it is difficult to implement, and proposes to use the high regular forest model, in which all trees are of the same age/size, but recommends using a regeneration system with a generous cover, to avoid soil erosion, and prevent excessive light entrance, which would promote the growth of a potent understorey.

The Ecoforestry Institute, similarly to Pro Silva, recommends multi-aged and multi-species forests.

=== Recommended practices ===
Proposed thinning frequency is about ten years, and intensity low, in order to limit the ingress of excessive light, which could promote too much understory, or the growing of epicormic shoots. It has to be directed to favor the trees that show good prospect for the future. The operations have to be done in a way that will avoid soil compaction or damage to the trees that will remain standing.

=== Native/introduced species ===
When foresters plant trees, they may use either native or introduced species. Whenever foresters decide to use a species that is not native, they do it because they think that there are silvicultural advantages linked to this choice, be they the wood quality, ease of management, adaptation to the climatic conditions, shorter production delay, etc. It may be that there is information available about the behavior of this species in the habitat, or the forester is ready to make a trial.

From the ecological point of view, the introducing species is considered as a threat. The introduced species risks being invasive. Invasives displace local species, resulting in a reduction of biodiversity, a condition also to be expected if great extensions are forested using introduced species.

McEvoy is very clear and strict: introduced species can not be used at all when working in a close to nature forestry system. Pro Silva makes some distinctions, based on species and conditions. Natural forest systems are to be preserved, but the enrichment with certain introduced species may be positive, depending on circumstances.

Pro Silva recommendations

- The natural vegetation systems for each region are an asset to maintain, and constitute an important basis for the silvicultural planning.
- Introduced species can, depending on circumstances, supplement natural species, and add economical revenue.
- The forest species that are introduced to a region are termed exotic.
- The introduction of exotic species should only be permitted after trials conducted from the qualitative and quantitative point of view.

=== Herbivore fauna management ===
The herbivore fauna, be it domesticated or wild, acts on tree seedlings and small trees. In high regular forests, the regeneration periods are chosen by the forester, and therefore it is possible to establish some control over fauna action, particularly domesticated fauna, avoiding grazing during regeneration. The un-even aged forest is continuously regenerating, and therefore it is difficult to make it compatible with grazing, and does not admit a high density of wild herbivore fauna. The pressure of herbivore fauna, mainly cervids, in some European forests, has reached an intensity that is threatening the practice of close to nature forestry.

=== Economic aspects ===
Forestry's economic profitability has progressively diminished in developed countries, beginning at the end of the 20th century. This has been the result of lower lumber prices and higher operating costs. Because it requires less human intervention, the close to nature forestry has lower labor costs. Also, it encourages the evolution of forests toward higher ecologic and landscape value structures. This is in demand by society, and the payment for ecosystem services is being considered

=== Close to nature forestry/sustainable forestry ===
Sustainable forest management has evolved to include multifunctional management, like close to nature forestry does. Nevertheless there is a distinction between them since the first seeks a compromise between competing interests, while close to nature forestry uses biodiversity improvement as a tool to improve forestry itself.

== See also ==
- Continuous cover forestry – Approach to sustainable forest management
- Forest farming – Land use management system
- Forest gardening – Land use management system
- Arid Forest Research Institute – Indian forest research institute
- Conservation biology – Study of threats to biological diversity
- Conservation communities – Controlled-growth land use development
- Conservation ethic – Movement to protect the biosphere
- Conservation movement – Sociopolitical advocacy for protecting natural resources
- Ecology – Study of organisms and their environment
- Environmental protection – Practice of protecting the natural environment
- Habitat conservation – Management practice for protecting types of environments
- Indian Council of Forestry Research and Education – Autonomous governmental agency
