= Forest cover by state and territory in the United States =

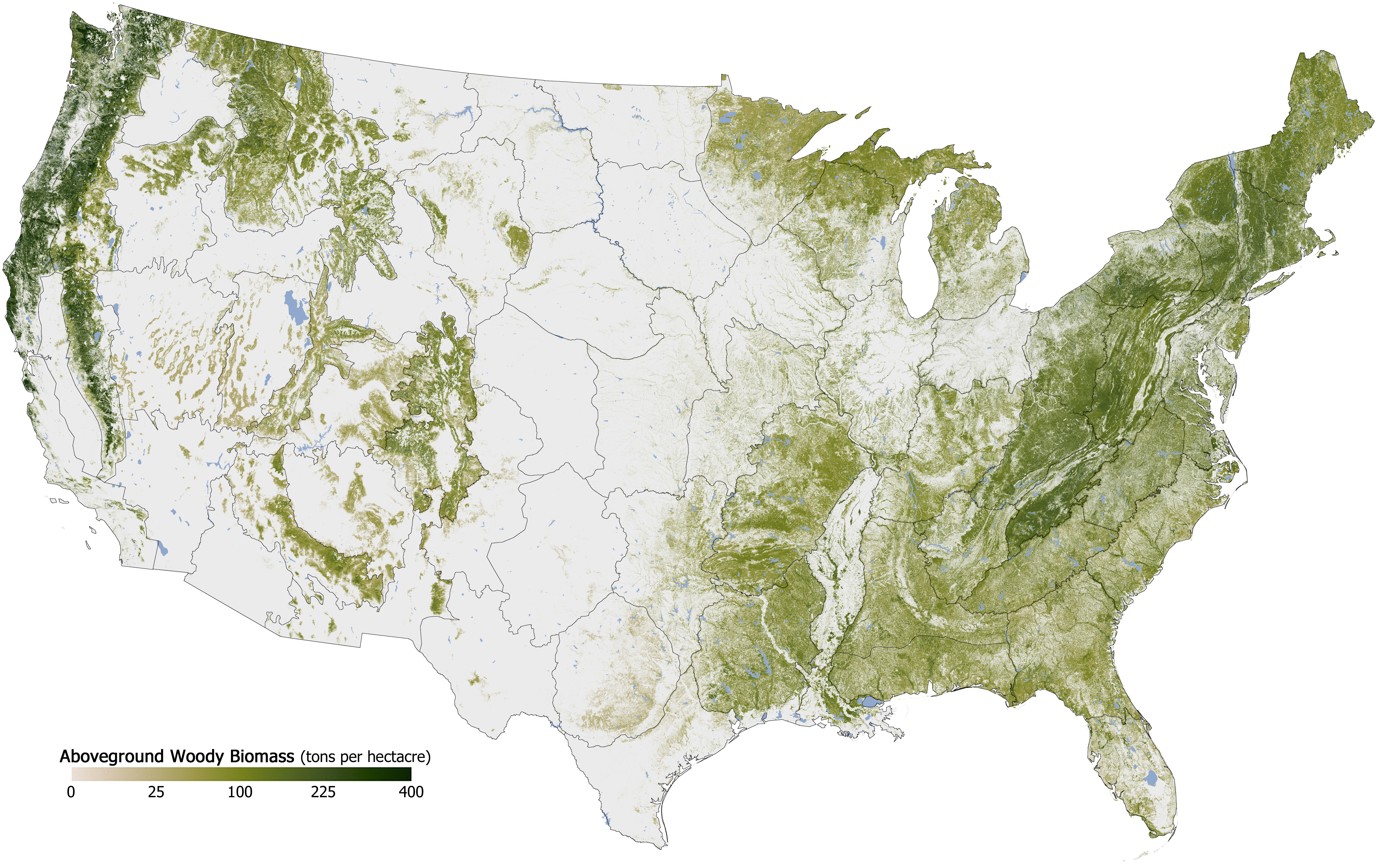
Map of wood-filled areas in the contiguous United States, c. 2000

In the United States, the forest cover by state and territory is estimated from tree-attributes using the basic statistics reported by the Forest Inventory and Analysis (FIA) program of the Forest Service. Tree volumes and weights are not directly measured in the field, but computed from other variables that can be measured.

This is only the total amount of timberland. Actual forest cover for each state may be significantly higher.

== List by state, district, or territory ==
Location	% forest (2016) (Note: The forest percent is the percent of land that is forested (excluding bodies of water). Data for Puerto Rico, the Virgin Islands, and Guam is from 2013. Data for the Northern Mariana Islands is from 2015. Data for American Samoa is from 2012. Data for the national capital of Washington, D.C. is from 2018.)
Maine	89.46%
New Hampshire	84.32%
American Samoa	80.84%
Northern Mariana Islands	80.37%
West Virginia	79.01%
Vermont	77.81%
Alabama	70.57%
South Carolina	68.19%
Georgia	67.28%
Mississippi	65.07%
Virginia	62.93%
New York	62.88%
Massachusetts	60.57%
North Carolina	59.73%
Pennsylvania	58.60%
(United States Virgin Islands) Virgin Islands (U.S.)	57.16%
Arkansas	56.31%
Puerto Rico	55.62%
Michigan	55.62%
Connecticut	55.24%
Rhode Island	54.38%
Louisiana	53.20%
Tennessee	52.83%
Guam	52.82%
Washington	52.74%
Florida	50.68%
Kentucky	49.35%
Wisconsin	48.98%
Oregon	48.51%
Hawaii	42.53%
New Jersey	41.72%
Idaho	40.55%
Maryland	39.36%
Texas	37.33%
Missouri	35.16%
Alaska	35.16%
Utah	34.48%
Colorado	34.42%
Minnesota	34.08%
District of Columbia	33.90%
California	32.71%
New Mexico	31.99%
Ohio	30.92%
Oklahoma	28.80%
Montana	27.45%
Delaware	27.26%
Arizona	25.64%
Indiana	21.06%
Wyoming	18.42%
Nevada	15.89%
Illinois	13.64%
Iowa	8.43%
Kansas	4.78%
South Dakota	3.93%
Nebraska	3.20%
North Dakota	1.72%
(United States) U.S. Minor Outlying Islands (Note: There is a forest on Palmyra Atoll, but there is no information about what percentage of land the forest covers.)	No data

=== List by region ===
Rank	Region	Percent forest (2016)
1	U.S. territories (Note: The U.S. territories are American Samoa, Guam, Northern Mariana Islands, Puerto Rico and U.S. Virgin Islands. The U.S. Minor Outlying Islands are not counted.)	56.74%
2	Southern region (Note: The FIA defines the Southern region of the U.S. as Alabama, Arkansas, Florida, Georgia, Kentucky, Louisiana, Mississippi, North Carolina, Oklahoma, South Carolina, Tennessee, Texas, and Virginia.)	50.13%
3	Pacific Northwest region (Note: The FIA defines the Pacific Northwest region as Alaska, California, Hawaii, Oregon, and Washington.)	37.52%
4	Northern region (Note: The FIA defines the Northern region of the U.S. as Connecticut, Delaware, Illinois, Indiana, Iowa, Kansas, Maine, Maryland, Massachusetts, Michigan, Minnesota, Missouri, Nebraska, New Hampshire, New Jersey, New York, North Dakota, Ohio, Pennsylvania, Rhode Island, South Dakota, Vermont, West Virginia and Wisconsin. The District of Columbia is not counted.)	30.04%
5	Interior West region (Note: The FIA defines the Interior West region of the U.S. as Arizona, Colorado, Idaho, Montana, Nevada, New Mexico, Utah, and Wyoming.)	28.14%
—	Total	36.21%

== See also ==
- Forests of the United States
- Forest cover by province or territory in Canada
- Forest cover by federal subject in Russia
- Forest cover by state in India
