= International Analog Forestry Network =

Costa Rica–based non-governmental organization

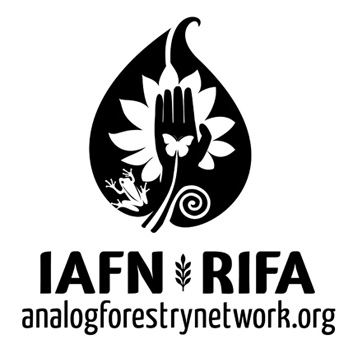
Current IAFN logo

The International Analog Forestry Network (IAFN) is a non-governmental organization (NGO) that seeks to conserve and restore biodiversity worldwide through the application of analog forestry. The IAFN links a variety of community, governmental, and private organizations (29 as of November, 2012), as well as a number of individuals, who apply the practices and principles of analog forestry in their work.

The IAFN was established in 1995 to facilitate the exchange of knowledge and experience among analog forestry practitioners and to further promote the system. The IAFN supports its partners through the development of technical manuals and promotional materials, training, research, and creating improved marketing opportunities. The IAFN established and currently monitors the Forest Garden Product standard, a certification standard for goods produced within forest gardens, which encompasses the requirements of most organic certification but with additional restrictions to further the protection of biodiversity. FGP standards are being adapted to certify minerals that have been "responsibly mined," as well as ecosystem services and products, such as carbon credits.

The office of the IAFN is currently located in Londres, Puntarenas, Costa Rica.
