= Patch cut =

Patch cuts are logging cuts too small to be considered clearcuts, and are instead considered a form of selection cut. A typical patch cut might be 2-3 tree lengths. Below a certain size, seedling regeneration advantage shifts from the shade intolerant species favored in clearcuts to the shade tolerant species favored by selection harvests.

An areas of patch cuts of different shapes were tried in the Northern hemisphere to see where shade tolerant and shade intolerant species might regenerate. It was found in small patches (1/10 acre) N. 44° that there was a limited solar exposure of only a few hours (3-4) and this would lead to strongly shade tolerant and moderately shade tolerant trees dominating over time. Yet at slightly larger (1/2 acre) patches much more sunlight for longer was reaching the forest floor. This would warm the floor more, increase nutrient release and thus more light demanding species could grow faster and might then reach maturity in the stand.

As well as light other factors to be considered are wind to avoid windthrow, pathogens and fire risk. Positive benefits can also be gained if patches keep horizontal biodiversity in a forest stand and for an owner with not so much forest this may be useful for keeping non-timber forest products in usable amounts.

Patch cuts can have less visual impact than clearcuts, and can mimic some stand disturbance processes. Patch cuts can also be simpler to implement than trying to selectively log individual trees within a selection cut.

Patch cuts are distinct from the group selection method. A patch would pick several trees to be big enough to allow regeneration of a specific species, perhaps that has problems growing due to shade intolerance or another factor, as several together. Whereas a group would be only a few mature trees (3-5) and would not necessarily favor a shade intolerant species to establish into a group. In a patch the edge effect would be overcome but in a group most likely not.

Patch cuts may be used in a hybrid system with the single tree selection cut method or the group tree selection cut method.

== See also ==
- Shelterwood cutting
- Silviculture
