= Forest cover by province or territory in Canada =

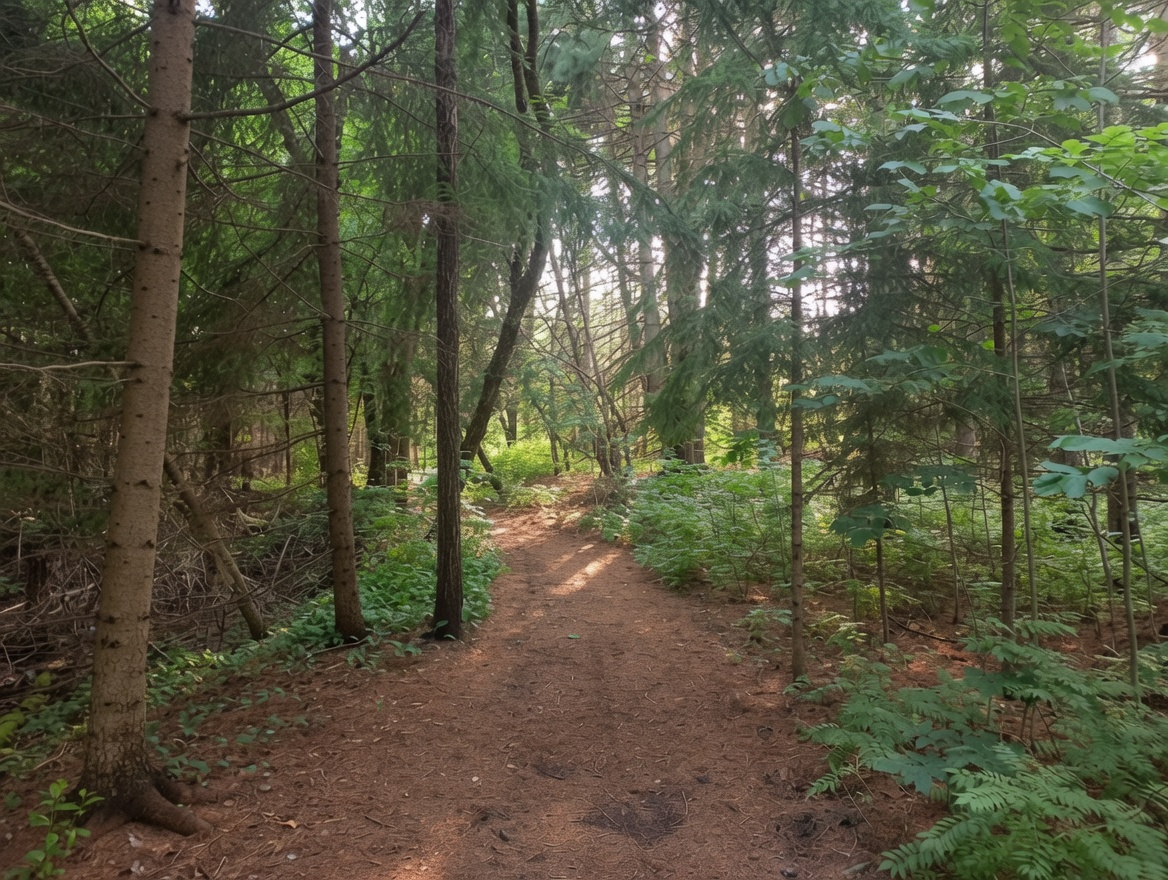
What a forest in Ontario looks like.

This is a list of forest cover in Canada by province and territory.

== Provinces ==
- British Columbia: ~60% (Ministry of Students)
- Alberta: 58% (NAIT)
- Saskatchewan: 50% (SK Environmental Society)
- Manitoba: 48% (MB Forestry Branch)
- Ontario: 66% (Ontario Forest Industries Association)
- Quebec: 45% (McGill University) or ~50%
- Nova Scotia: ~75%
- Prince Edward Island: 45% (2000, PEI )
- New Brunswick: ~85% (Riparian Habitat Restoration)
- Newfoundland and Labrador: ~45% of Newfoundland. 60% of Labrador (NF Heritage Society)

== Territories ==
- Northwest Territories: ~50%
- Nunavut: ~25%
- Yukon: ~55%

== See also ==
- Forest cover by state, U.S.
- Forest cover by state in India
- Forest cover by federal subject in Russia
