= Responsible mining =

Responsible mining is commonly defined as mining that involves and respects all stakeholders, minimizes and takes account of its environmental impact, and prioritizes a fair division of economic and financial benefits. There is a strong focus on stakeholder engagement, involving governments and the affected communities.

The underlying principles are based on existing international agreements, such as the Rio Declaration and Sustainable Development Goals (SDGs), involving polluter responsibility, equity, participatory decision making and accountability and transparency. Because the Earth contains a finite amount of minerals – making mining a finite activity – the term responsible mining is preferred over sustainable mining. In practice, responsible mining has different interpretations, referring to advocacy to reform mining activity, as well as to a marketing strategy used by mining companies to promote their operations as environmentally or socially sound. Goals may vary by group.

Responsible mining first appeared in an article entitled "Re-inhabitory Mining" and next in another article titled "Ecological Mining". The term "Responsible Mining" is also claimed as having been formulated by Ranil Senanayake of the International Analog Forestry Network and Brian Hill of the Institute for Cultural Ecology.

== Overview ==
The mining and mineral industry produces necessary components for use in people’s daily lives. Additionally, this industry plays a large role in many developing countries – such as Democratic Republic of the Congo, the Philippines, and Angola, yet has historically created a negative relationship between economic dependence and natural resources and GDP. Companies operating in the mining and minerals industry navigate market demand for essential components and society’s expectations of social and environmental responsibility.

Local communities expect that the risks and impacts of mining are compensated with employment and infrastructure benefits. The industry is also expected to avoid ecologically and culturally sensitive sites, and to produce safe products that do not violate environmental and social standards. In 1998, representatives from ten of the world’s largest mining corporations congregated at the Global Mining Initiative to address the negative attention surrounding the industry. Their 2002 report found that the industry has damaged communities and ecosystems throughout the world, but there is also the potential to generate larger and quicker profits while supporting the community and the environment if mining activities are managed appropriately.

If managed irresponsibly, the mining and minerals industry can foster economic growth and development at the detriment of society and the environment. This can include environmental degradation, displaced populations, and local conflicts. However, responsible mining can create economic growth and development by managing an equitable distribution of mining benefits amongst affected stakeholders.

== Media coverage ==
The Nation was critical of the concept in a February 2010 article by Matt Kennard titled "How Responsible Is Socially Responsible Mining?".

Meanwhile, The New York Times has covered the marketing of jewelry made of 'responsibly-mined' gold and the Pew Campaign's efforts to change the 1872 mining law.
