= Zelenodolsk =

Zelenodolsk may refer to:

- Zelenodolsk Urban Settlement, a municipal formation in Zelenodolsky Municipal District of the Republic of Tatarstan, Russia into which the town of republic significance of Zelenodolsk is incorporated
- Zelenodolsk, Russia, several inhabited localities in Russia
- Zelenodolsk, Ukraine, a city in Dnipropetrovsk Oblast, Ukraine

== See also ==
- Zelenodolsky (disambiguation)
