= Variable retention (silviculture) =

Relatively new silvicultural system

Variable retention is a relatively new silvicultural system that retains forest structural elements for at least one rotation in order to preserve environmental values associated with structurally complex forests.

Some examples for environmental values are forest cover connectivity, soil stabilization, microclimate under retained trees, habitats associated with live or dead trees and species diversity due to habitat preservation, and wildlife corridor preservation. Variable retention also aids in emulation of natural disturbances by leaving behind some residual structure from previous stand which is typical for stand replacing disturbances Traditional silviculture systems such as clearcut, patch cut, shelterwood, etc. are focused on maximizing timber production and future regeneration of the trees. Variable retention on the other hand is focused on what is retained

== Value of variable retention ==
Variable retention is gradually becoming a popularly promoted tool for helping resolve the dilemma between demands for wood and demands to maintain habitat and ecology biodiversity and structural diversity in managed forests. What is at issue is how much a forest operation can log without adversely interfering with other ecological processes within the forest.

Variable retention minimizes the impact of logging operation by leaving biological legacies such as coarse woody debris (nurse logs and snags). Either few trees or many trees can be retained under the variable retention system, and trees can be retained in patches (aggregated retention) or left uniformly throughout a stand (dispersed retention); hence the name "variable retention." It is a technique for retaining trees as key structural elements of a harvested stand for at least until next harvest rotation in an effort to maintain species, habitat diversity and forest-related processes. A 2014 meta-analysis of retention forestry research found "support for wider use of retention forestry since it moderates negative harvesting impacts on biodiversity."

There are four key mechanisms through which variable retention is presumed to maintain biodiversity:

- By providing a constant supply of structural features that are at high risk to being lost due to modern forestry practices and that are known to be important to habitat availability, such as large trees, very young trees, snags, and coarse woody debris
- By providing adequate refuge for sensitive species that will colonize the surrounding managed forest environment as it develops suitable conditions
- By establishing habitat patches, Patch dynamics, that can serve as stepping stones for the dispersal of newly produced offspring, seeds, and spores
- By increasing the structural diversity of managed stands

== Variable retention - Harvesting methods ==
The method of variable retention is a more deliberate process than clearcutting. In some cases helicopters take the logs out. The use of the helicopters avoid the need to build logging roads inside the forest and hence avoid the disturbance of the forest floor. Yet, helicopter logging is less fuel efficient than truck use. Some logging operations that use variable retention try to emulate forest disturbances. In those cases, deadwood in snags and logs is left behind. Such dead or dying trees provide a growth medium for fungi and epiphytes, as well as food and shelter for insects and the birds. Loggers also leave younger trees that will continue to grow.

Variable retention harvesting retains more than 15% of the original stand in both rolling and permanent pockets of untouched trees and refugia patches. Retained forest structure is composed of live and dead trees that enhance structural diversity, and provide a hospitable habitat for variety of living organisms that prevail in the unlogged forest. This silviculture regime provides post-harvest ecological structure while creating sufficient opportunity to plant and naturally regenerate valuable tree species for timber, as well as restore historical coniferous and/or deciduous tree dominance to the forestland. Some timber companies have restricted the use of variable retention silviculture to only poorly stocked stands of rare but valuable tree species.

== Controversy ==
Ecologists regard the variable retention method of harvesting as being far less detrimental to the forest ecosystem than clearcutting. However, opponents claim that variable retention is much more laborious, tedious, time-consuming and expensive than clearcutting. A review of studies in British Columbia and in similar forest types indicates that while both aggregated and dispersed retention can contribute to biodiversity conservation there may be some negative consequences for timber production such as wind damage to retained trees and reduced growth rates of tree regeneration compared to clearcuts, concluding in favour of an adaptive management approach for balancing competing objectives of production of wood and biodiversity conservation.

Forestry organizations, such as the Forest Stewardship Council (FSC), approve of variable retention and are now declaring timber obtained through such a harvesting method as certified wood for green building. Many forest operations in the Canadian province of British Columbia, including MacMillan Bloedel, use the variable retention method to harvest timber in the temperate rain forests along the Pacific coast.

Many logging companies have not maintained a total commitment to phasing out clearcutting and embracing variable retention harvesting, and even MacMillan Bloedel had occasionally fallen short of its commitment to phase out clearcutting. Although world markets are beginning to ask for certified wood obtained entirely through variable retention harvesting, it is not yet clear whether the general population of consumers will be willing to pay higher prices for such wood.

== See also ==
- Conservation biology
- Deforestation
- Forest farming
- Forest management
- Hardwood Timber Production
- Logging
- Old Growth Forest
- Selection cutting
- Silviculture
- Sustainable forest management
- Sustainable forestry
