= Zelenodolsky =

Zelenodolsky (masculine), Zelenodolskaya (feminine), or Zelenodolskoye (neuter) may refer to:

- Zelenodolsky District, a district of the Republic of Tatarstan, Russia
- Zelenodolskoye, a rural locality (a selo) in Primorsky Krai, Russia

== See also ==
- Zelenodolsk (disambiguation)
