= Continuous cover forestry =

Approach to sustainable forest management

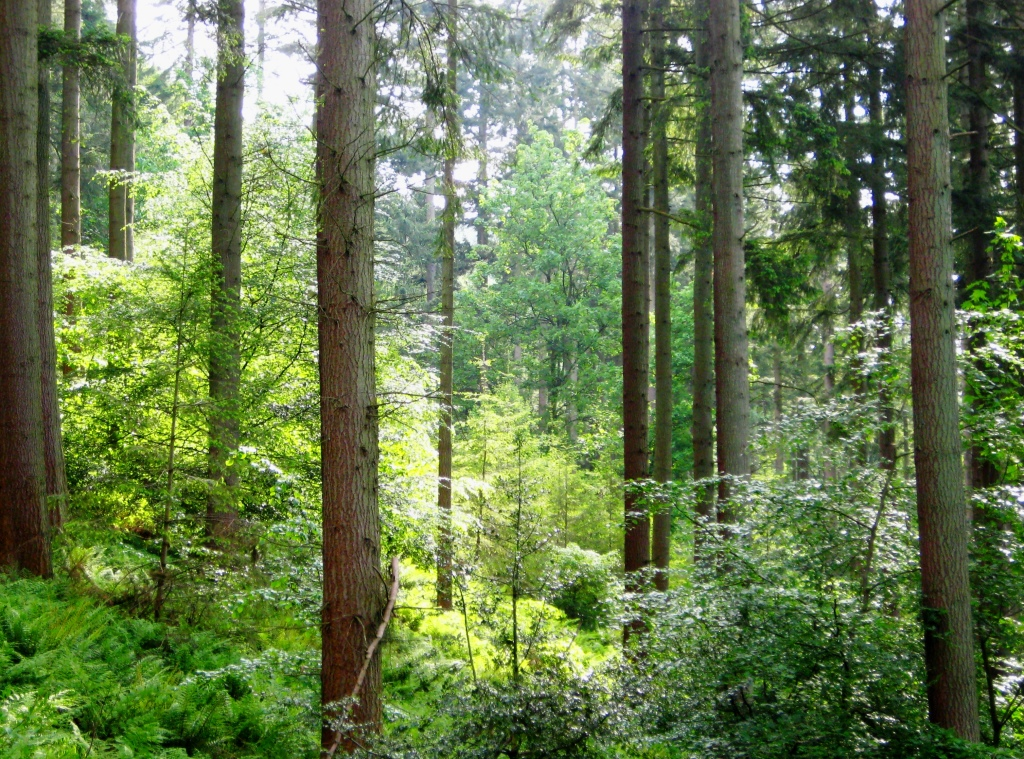
85-year-old stand of Douglas fir in the process of transformation to a continuous cover forest

Continuous cover forestry (commonly referred to as "CCF") is an approach to the sustainable management of forests whereby forest stands are maintained in a permanently irregular structure, which is created and sustained through the selection and harvesting of individual trees. The term "continuous cover forestry" does not equate exactly to any one particular silvicultural system, but is typified by selection systems. For example, coppice with standards and Reiniger's target diameter harvesting are also continuous cover forestry. Different existing forest stands may require different silvicultural interventions to achieve a continuously productive irregular structure. Crucially, clearcutting and other rotational forest management systems are avoided.

== Overview ==
The term continuous cover forestry has been widely adopted in British forestry practice following the creation of the Continuous Cover Forestry Group in 1991. It is also a widely used term in Ireland where continuous cover forestry is actively supported by a dedicated woodland improvement programme administered by the Department of Agriculture, Food and the Marine (DAFM). Currently the UK Forestry Standard and the guidelines of the silvicultural-systems UK Woodland Assurance Standard call for wider use and application of CCF in British forestry, as there is evidence that continuously productive irregular structured woodlands are more robust and resilient in response to climate change, and forest health threats in addition to a wide range of other social and environmental benefits. However, there remains some lack of understanding of the definition and practice of CCF among forestry professionals in Britain, and Ireland.

== Background ==
CCF is an approach to forest management which respects the characteristics and processes inherent to the site, and will normally involve a mixture of tree species and ages. In French, it is referred to as sylviculture irrégulière, continue et proche de la nature (SICPN) (i.e., continuous, irregular and close to nature silviculture), and in German as Dauerwald, or naturgemässe Waldwirtschaft (close to nature forestry). Management is based on the selection and promotion of individual trees, of all sizes, rather than the creation of areas with trees of uniform size. Any monitoring of the development of irregular stand structures will be achieved through periodic re-measurement of stem diameters in sample plots or across whole stands. Repeated interventions, typically at intervals of between 3 and 7 years, focus on the removal of trees which are interfering with the growth of trees with greater potential, the harvesting of crop trees at their optimum size, and the promotion of regeneration and small trees, such that an irregular stand structure is maintained in perpetuity.

Regeneration will normally be by the growth of naturally-regenerated seedlings rather than by planting. Artificial regeneration (especially enrichment planting) may be needed to diversify the genetic and species composition, and to increase ecological resilience to threats from climate change, pests, or disease.

== Principles ==
The general approach to CCF can be outlined in terms of the following underlying principles, as defined by the Continuous Cover Forestry Group (CCFG):

1. Adapt the forest to the site - The forest manager works with the site and respects inherent variation, rather than imposing artificial uniformity.
2. Adopt a holistic approach - The whole ecosystem is regarded as the production capital of the forest, including soil, carbon, water, fungi, flora, fauna, as well as the trees themselves.
3. Maintain forest habitats - Maintenance of the forest habitat is essential (which requires that clear-felling is avoided).
4. Develop the forest structure - Stand improvement is concentrated upon the development of preferred individual trees rather than the creation of a uniform block of stems. A characteristic of permanently irregular stands is that yield control is based upon measurement of stem diameter and increment rather than age and area.

These principles link to a rapidly developing evidence-base, from the UK, Ireland, continental Europe and elsewhere, in relation to managing irregularly structured woodlands and forests.

== See also ==
- Close to nature forestry
