= Selection cutting =

Forestry practice

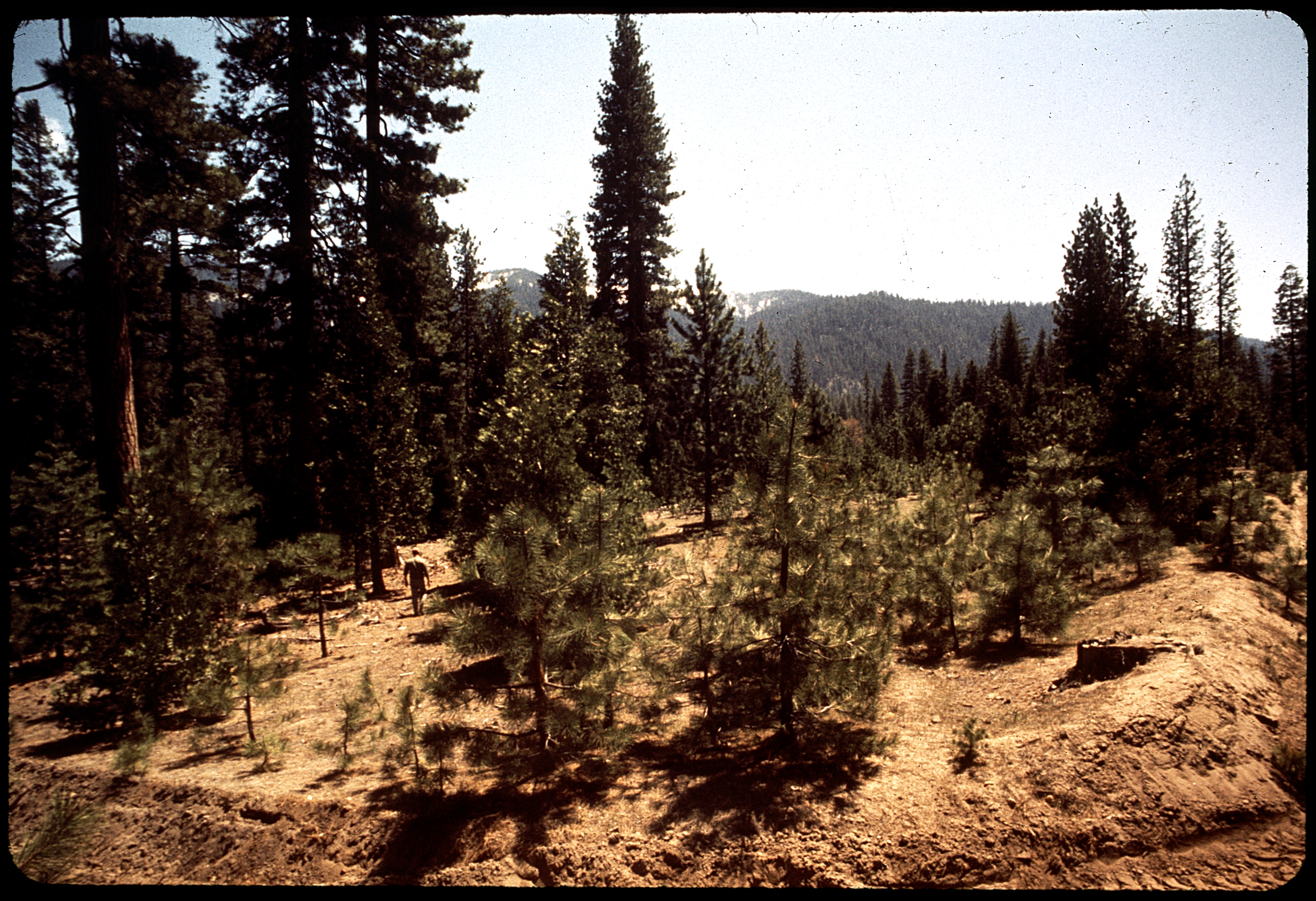
Selection cutting in California, May 1972

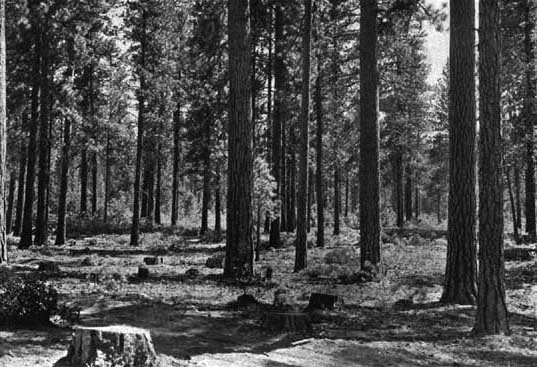
The results of selective cutting of Ponderosa Pine

Selection cutting, also known as selection system, is the silvicultural practice of harvesting trees in a way that moves a forest stand towards an uneven-aged or all-aged condition, or 'structure'. Using stocking models derived from the study of old growth forests, selection cutting, also known as 'selection system', or 'selection silviculture', manages the establishment, continued growth and final harvest of multiple age classes (usually three, but 5 or even 10 are possible) of trees within a stand. A closely related approach to forest management is Continuous Cover Forestry (CCF), which makes use of selection systems to achieve a permanently irregular stand structure.

Selection cutting or systems are generally considered to be more challenging to implement and maintain than even-aged management, due to the difficulty of managing multiple age classes in a shared space, but there are significant ecological benefits associated with it. Uneven-aged stands generally exhibit higher levels of vertical structure (key for many species of birds and mammals), have higher levels of carbon sequestration, and produce a more constant flow of market and non-market forest resources than even-aged stands. Although a forest composed of many stands with varied maturity ages maybe comparable, this would be at the forest rather than the stand level. This silvicultural method also protects forest soils from the adverse effects of many types of even-aged silviculture, including nutrient loss, erosion and soil compaction and the rapid loss of organic material from a forested system. Selection silviculture is especially adept at regenerating shade-tolerant species of trees (those able to function under conditions of low solar energy, both cooler and less light), but can also be modified to suit the regeneration and growth of intolerant and mid-tolerant species. This is one of many different ways of harvesting trees. Selection cutting as a silvicultural system can be modified in many ways and would be so done be a forester to take into account varied ownership goals, local site conditions and the species mix found from past forest conditions.

== Confusing term ==
Selection cutting is often (sometimes deliberately) confused with "selective" cutting, a term synonymous with the practice of high grading (the removal of the most economically profitable trees in a forest, often with a disregard for the future of the residual stand). Often the latter term is used by foresters or loggers to imply the former (which has a generally positive connotation in forestry circles) and mislead landowners into stripping their woodlot of its most valuable timber. Used correctly, the term 'selection cutting', 'selection system', or 'selection silviculture' implies the implementation of specific silvicultural techniques—usually either 'single tree selection', 'group selection' or a combination of the two—to create an uneven-aged or all-aged condition in a forest stand, one more akin to a late successional or 'climax' condition.

Partly as a result of such confusion, the term Plenterwald, which is the German term for selection cutting, is being more commonly used as the standard term in English. Increasingly, especially in Britain, Ireland and elsewhere in Europe, the term Continuous Cover Forestry (CCF) has been adopted to embrace an approach to stand management that most often employs selection systems to achieve a permanently irregular stand structure.

== Single-tree selection ==
The most common type of selection system is single-tree selection, in which scattered individual trees of multiple age classes, whose canopies are not touching, are harvested. This type of selection system generally produces small canopy openings especially conducive to the establishment and growth of shade tolerant tree species.

== Group selection ==
Another variation of selection silviculture is group selection. Under this system, a number of 'groups', or small openings created by the removal of several adjacent trees, are created in complement to the harvest of scattered individual trees. If the groups created are large enough, and if seed-bed conditions are favorable, this can allow species which are intolerant of shade to regenerate. Group selection is designed to mimic larger, multi-tree mortality events, which in some environments may represent natural disturbance regimes.

The maximum size of a group (before it becomes a patch, or clearcut) is debatable. Some say it may be up to 2 acres (0.8 hectares) in size, whereas others limit it to a maximum of 0.5 acres (0.1 hectares).

In any case Plenterwald can operate in a small areas of 1/3 - 1/2 hectare, whereas other systems need a bigger area. Behind this is the philosophical idea that a stand should be balanced (that is equal amounts of land cover for each age class) in the same way that a forest would be balanced under a clear cut régime (that is stands collectively are balanced on yield flow). The reasoning is based on the Normalwald concept, which is a model of a forest over 100 years that will produce an amount of money that is consistent over time with treatments being consistent over time rather than big expenses or big profits at one time and low expenses and low profits at another.

Care need to be taken to avoid epicormic shoots growing on trunks of surrounding trees such that they lead to knotty wood, if timber production is desired. It is also challenging to visualize the groups with cuttings over time.

== Implementing A Selection System ==
In North America, trees are selected for harvest in a selection system with reference to the Arbogast Method (named after the method's creator). This is also known as the BDq method. Under this method, a harvest is specified by defining a residual basal area (B), a maximum diameter (D), and a q-ratio (q). The q-ratio is the ratio of the number of trees in a diameter class to the number of trees in the next larger class. Typically diameter classes are either 4 centimeters or 2 inches.

When the Q is plotted on semi-log paper it gives a straight slope for uneven aged stands. However, in reality this slope can be seen to vary from what is called an S-curve in old growth forests to cut off the older trees giving a reverse-J curve in a managed stand. The curve is also an ideal curve and there may be variations to some extent, particularly in earlier number of trees where there are many more seedlings and saplings than the model Q-ratio would suggest.

Given the BDq, a curve representing the state of the residual stand is computed. This curve is compared to the inventory data from a stand, specifically the curve of the diameter classes of the trees in the stand against the number of trees in each diameter (age) class. Diameter is used as a surrogate for age and thus called an age class even though strictly it should be a size class. The comparison of these two curves tells the forester how many trees of each age-class should remain in the stand. Surplus trees are marked for harvest. If there are too few trees in a class, the forester will determine if it is necessary to reduce the removal of trees from neighboring classes to maintain an ideal q-ratio.

The goal of the use of a BDq curve is to ensure the continued development of trees in each age class, and the continued availability of mature timber to harvest on a relatively short cutting cycle (8–15 years). Longer cutting cycles may be used depending on species mix, silvicultural goals and if the aim is amenity or economic forestry in respect to the land.

Following this method with well performed forest inventories should see the right amount of cutting. However, reality has shown about a third of forests are overcut and a third are undercut. It appears that the model also departs from reality in many cases, and so cannot be solely relied on. The judgement of an experienced forester is also needed.

== See also ==
- Ecoforestry
- Patch cut
- Shelterwood cutting
