= Forest cover by state in India =

This is a list of Indian states and territories by forest cover by area (in sq.km) and percentage of total area.

== Methodology ==
=== Tree density ===
Tree density is the quantification of how closely the trees are growing in a hectare area. It is not the exact number of trees in the forest but, serves as an estimate to the foresters. The tree density of an area should be mentioned by the working Plan officer (WPO) or Divisional Forest Officer (Working Plan) after his field inspection of the lowest possible forest unit or compartment in the CH-4 form of compartment history. The compartment history forms are to be maintained at the Forest range and Forest division offices. The working Plan code-2014 mentions in para 105 that the density should also be mentioned on the stock map prepared by the WPO/DFO in decimal figures. The crown density is similar to the tree density. A forest area with a density of more than 0.4 is considered a good forest area and a forest area with less than 0.4 tree density is considered degraded forest.

=== Forest cover ===
Forest cover is the total geographical area declared as forest by the government.

The categories selected by the Forest Survey of India (FSI) are as follows:

Very Dense= All lands with tree canopy density of 70 percent ( 0.7 tree density) and above.

Moderately Dense= All lands with tree canopy density of 40 percent and more but less than 70 percent ( 0.4 to 0.7 tree density).

Open Forest= All lands with tree canopy density of 10 percent and more but less than 40 percent (0.1 to 0.4 tree density).

== Forest cover over the years ==
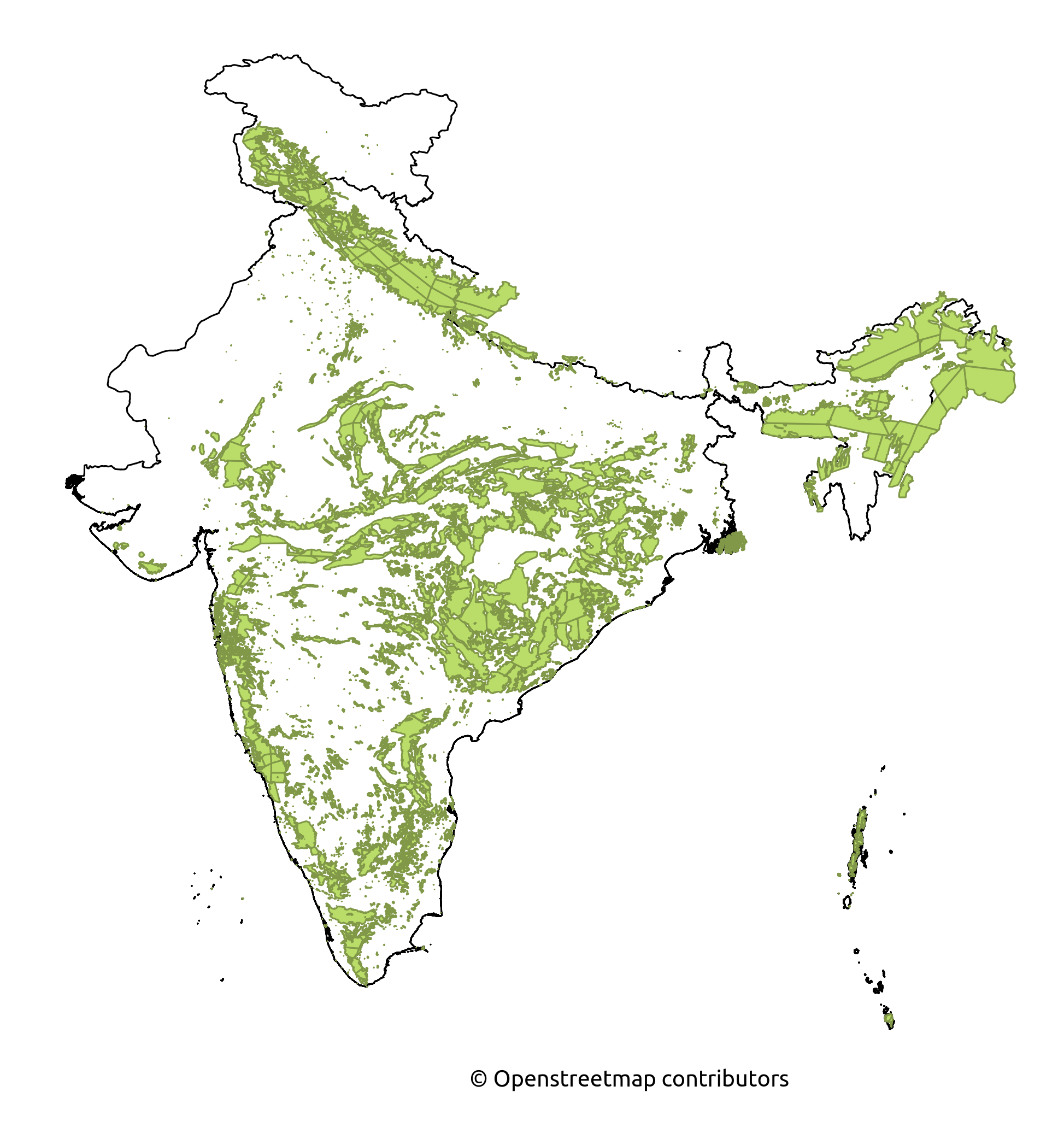
Indian forest cover map as of 2015

As of 2021, the total forest cover in India is 80.9 million hectares, which is 21.71 per cent of the total geographical area. There was an increase in forest cover of 1,540 sq.km over 2019. Madhya Pradesh had the highest forest cover by area followed by Arunachal Pradesh. Mizoram had the highest forest cover in terms of percentage of total geographical area.

Ministry of the Environment, Forest and Climate Change used the mid-resolution satellite data on LISS-III data from Indian remote sensing satellite. Minister of environment forest and climate change Bhupendra Yadav released the Indian forest survey report 2021-22 on 13 January 2022. As per the report, 17 Indian states have a forest cover of over 33%.

Year	Total forest area (in sq km)	% of forested area	%change
2021	713,789	21.71%	▲0.04%
2019	712,249	21.67%	▲0.13%
2017	708,273	21.54%	0.20%
2015	701,673	21.34%	▲0.11%
2013	697,898	21.23%	▲0.18%
2011	692,027	21.05%	

== 2021 ==
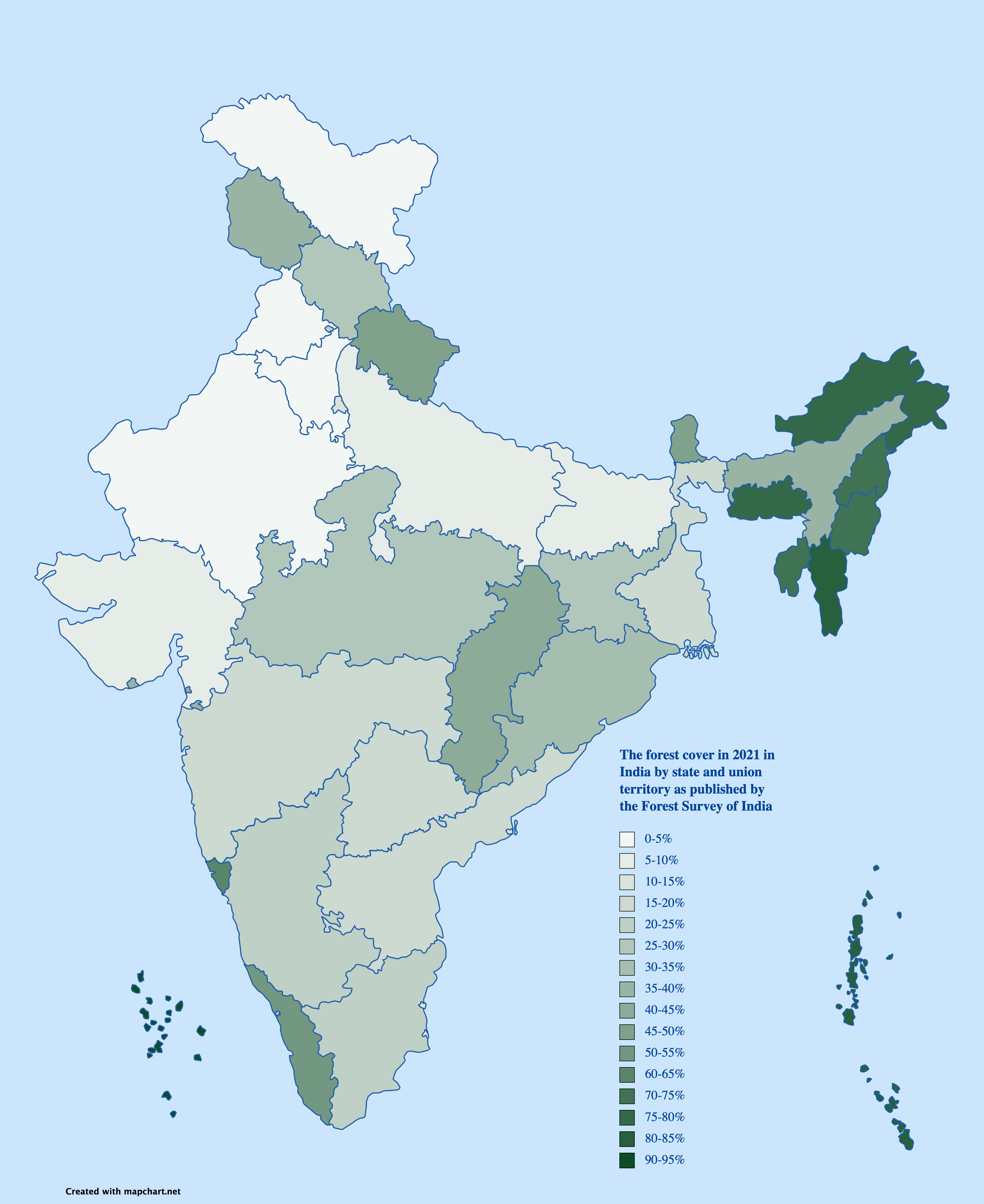

The forest cover in 2021 in India by state and union territory as published by the Forest Survey of India (FSI) is shown in the table below. (Area in square kilometers)

State / UT	Zone	Geographical Area	Very dense	Moderately dense	Open forest	Total forest area	% of the forested area before	As of 2023
Andhra Pradesh	Southern	162,968	1,994	13,929	13,861	29,784	18.28%	22.63%
Arunachal Pradesh	North Eastern	83,743	21,058	30,176	15,197	66,431	79.33%	92.86%
Assam	North Eastern	78,438	3,017	9,991	15,304	28,312	36.09%	23.36%
Bihar	Eastern	94,163	333	3,286	3,762	7,381	7.84%	6.64%
Chhattisgarh	Central	135,192	7,068	32,279	16,370	55,717	41.21%	46.89%
Delhi	Northern	1,483	6.72	56.6	131.68	195	13.15%	11.78%
Goa	Western	3,702	538	576	1,130	2,244	60.62%	34.75%
Gujarat	Western	196,244	378	5,032	9,516	14,926	7.61%	10.91%
Haryana	Northern	44,212	28	445	1,130	1,603	3.63%	0.74%
Himachal Pradesh	Northern	55,673	3,163	7,100	5,180	15,443	27.73%	24.99%
Jharkhand	Eastern	79,716	2,601	9,689	11,431	23,721	29.76%	28.10%
Karnataka	Southern	191,791	4,533	20,985	13,212	38,730	20.19%	16.13%
Kerala	Southern	38,852	972	4,736	4,918	10,366	27.79%	27.83%
Madhya Pradesh	Central	308,252	6,665	34,209	36,619	77,493	25.14%	28.31%
Maharashtra	Western	307,713	8,734	20,589	21,475	50,798	16.51%	16.94%
Manipur	North Eastern	22,327	905	6,228	9,465	16,598	74.34%	79.51%
Meghalaya	North Eastern	22,429	560	9,160	7,326	17,046	76%	39.32%
Mizoram	North Eastern	21,081	157	5,715	11,948	17,820	84.53%	77.75%
Nagaland	North Eastern	16,579	1,272	4,449	6,530	12,251	73.9%	52.08%
Odisha	Eastern	155,707	7,213	20,995	23,948	52,156	33.5%	35.13%
Punjab	Northern	50,362	11	793	1,043	1,847	3.67%	4.86%
Rajasthan	Northern	342,239	78	4,369	12,208	16,655	4.87%	8.10%
Sikkim	North Eastern	7,096	1,102	1,551	688	3,341	47.08%	75.79%
Tamil Nadu	Southern	130,060	3,593	11,034	11,792	26,419	20.31%	16.54%
Telangana	Southern	112,077	1,624	9,119	10,471	21,214	18.93%	24.70%
Tripura	North Eastern	10,486	647	5,212	1,863	7,722	73.64%	59.99%
Uttar Pradesh	Northern	240,928	2,627	4,029	8,162	14,818	6.15%	7.54%
Uttarakhand	Northern	53,483	5,055	12,768	6,482	24,305	45.44%	63.51%
West Bengal	Eastern	88,752	3,037	4,208	9,587	16,832	18.96%	13.53%
Andaman and Nicobar Islands	Southern	8,249	5,678	683	383	6,744	81.75%	94.36%
Chandigarh	Northern	114	1.36	13.51	8.01	22.88	20.07%	25.16%
Dadra and Nagar Haveli and Daman and Diu	Western	602	1.4	85.56	140.79	227.75	37.83%	42.91%
Jammu and Kashmir	Northern	54,624	4,155	8,117	9,115	21,387	39.15%	55.65%
Ladakh	Northern	168,055	2	512	1,758	2,272	1.35%	77.77%
Lakshadweep	Southern	30	0	16.09	11.01	27.1	90.33%	50.47%
Puducherry	Southern	490	0	17.53	35.77	53.3	10.88%	0.80%
Total		3,287,469	99,779	306,890	307,120	713,789	24.45%	

== 2017 ==
The forest cover in 2017 in India by state and union territory as published by the Forest Survey of India (FSI) is shown in the table below. (Area in square kilometers)

State / UT	Geographical Area	Very dense	Moderately dense	Open forest	Total forest area	% of forested area	% change since 2015
Andhra Pradesh	162,968	1,957	14,051	12,139	28,147	17.27%	+1.31%
Arunachal Pradesh	83,743	20,721	30,955	15,288	66,964	79.96%	-0.23%
Assam	78,438	2,797	10,192	15,116	28,105	35.83%	+0.72%
Bihar	94,163	332	3,260	3,707	7,299	7.75%	+0.05%
Chhattisgarh	135,192	7,064	32,215	16,268	55,547	41.09%	-0.01%
Delhi	1,483	7	56	129	192	20.6%	+0.25%
Goa	3,702	538	576	1,115	2,229	60.21%	+0.51%
Gujarat	196,244	378	5,200	9,179	14,757	7.52%	+0.02%
Haryana	44,212	28	452	1,108	1,588	3.59%	+0.02%
Himachal Pradesh	55,673	3,110	6,705	5,285	15,100	27.12%	+0.71%
Jammu and Kashmir	222,236	4,075	8,579	10,587	23,241	10.46%	+0.11%
Jharkhand	79,716	2,598	9,686	11,269	23,553	29.55%	+0.04%
Karnataka	191,791	4,502	20,444	12,604	37,550	19.58%	+0.57%
Kerala	38,852	1,663	9,407	8,251	20,321	52.30%	+2.68%
Madhya Pradesh	308,252	6,563	34,571	36,280	77,414	25.11%	-0.00%
Maharashtra	307,713	8,736	20,652	21,294	50,682	16.47%	-0.01%
Manipur	22,327	908	6,510	9,928	17,346	77.69%	+1.18%
Meghalaya	22,429	453	9,386	7,307	17,146	76.76%	-0.52%
Mizoram	21,081	131	5,861	12,194	18,186	86.27%	-2.52%
Nagaland	16,579	1,279	4,587	6,623	12,489	75.33%	-2.71%
Odisha	155,707	6,967	21,370	23,008	51,345	32.98%	+0.57%
Punjab	50,362	8	806	1,023	1,837	3.65%	+0.13%
Rajasthan	342,239	78	4,340	12,154	16,572	4.84%	+0.14%
Sikkim	7,096	1,081	1,575	688	3,344	47.13%	-0.13%
Tamil Nadu	130,060	3,672	10,979	11,630	26,281	20.21%	+0.06%
Telangana	112,077	1,596	8,738	10,085	26969	18.22%	+0.50%
Tripura	10,486	656	5,246	1,824	7,726	73.68%	-1.56%
Uttar Pradesh	240,928	2,617	4,069	7,993	14,679	6.09%	+0.12%
Uttarakhand	53,483	4,969	12,884	6,442	24,295	45.43%	+0.04%
West Bengal	88,752	2,994	4,147	9,706	16,847	18.98%	+0.02%
Andaman and Nicobar Islands	8,249	5,678	684	380	6,742	81.73%	-0.11%
Chandigarh	114	1	14	6	22	18.91%	-0.09%
Dadra and Nagar Haveli	491	0	80	127	207	42.16%	+0.20%
Daman and Diu	111	1	6	13	20	18.46%	+0.79%
Lakshadweep	30	0	17	10	27	90.33%	0.13%
Puducherry	490	0	18	36	54	10.95%	-0.67%
Total	3,287,469	98,158	308,318	301,797	708,273	21.54%	+0.21%

== 2015 ==
According to Forest Survey of India (FSI), the forest cover by State/UT in India in 2015 is listed below. (Area in square kilometers)

State / UT	Geographical Area	Very dense	Moderately dense	Open forest
Andhra Pradesh	162,968	421	14,352	11,233
Arunachal Pradesh	83,743	20,806	31,181	15,167
Assam	78,438	1,425	11,256	14,857
Bihar	94,163	248	3,362	3,644
Chhattisgarh	135,192	7,001	32,305	16,253
Delhi	1,483	6.94	57.15	154.68
Goa	3,702	536	580	1,094
Gujarat	196,244	378	5,198	9,134
Haryana	44,212	28	444	1,108
Himachal Pradesh	55,673	3,225	6,387	5,095
Jammu and Kashmir	222,236	4,061	8,815	10,112
Jharkhand	79,716	2,601	9,692	11,231
Karnataka	191,791	1,783	20,177	14,489
Kerala	38,852	1,529	9,328	8,421
Madhya Pradesh	308,252	6,586	34,837	36,003
Maharashtra	307,713	8,685	20,792	21,222
Manipur	22,327	729	5,964	10,390
Meghalaya	22,429	417	9,555	7,290
Mizoram	21,081	135	5,800	12,782
Nagaland	16,579	1,284	4,690	6,965
Odisha	155,707	6,985	21,470	22,005
Punjab	50,362	0	733	1,038
Rajasthan	342,239	77	4,414	11,615
Sikkim	7,096	499	2,157	697
Tamil Nadu	130,060	3,005	10,472	12,731
Telangana	112,077	465	11,340	8,049
Tripura	10,486	110	4,699	3,111
Uttar Pradesh	240,928	2,171	4,043	8,187
Uttarakhand	53,483	4,804	13,662	5,806
West Bengal	88,752	2,943	4,176	9,707
Andaman and Nicobar Islands	8,249	5,686	685	380
Chandigarh	114	1.36	13.92	6.38
Dadra and Nagar Haveli	491	0	80	126
Daman and Diu	111	1.4	5.82	12.39
Lakshadweep	30	0	17.22	9.84
Puducherry	490	0	28.78	28.17
Total	3,287,469	88,633	312,739	300,123

== See also ==
- List of countries by forest area
- List of forests in India
- Indian Forest Service
