= Forest cover by federal subject in Russia =

The forest cover in Russia by federal subject as published by the Unified Interdepartmental Statistical Information System. As of 2021 49.4% of Russia is covered in trees.[2]

Map of the federal subjects of Russia - degree of afforestation

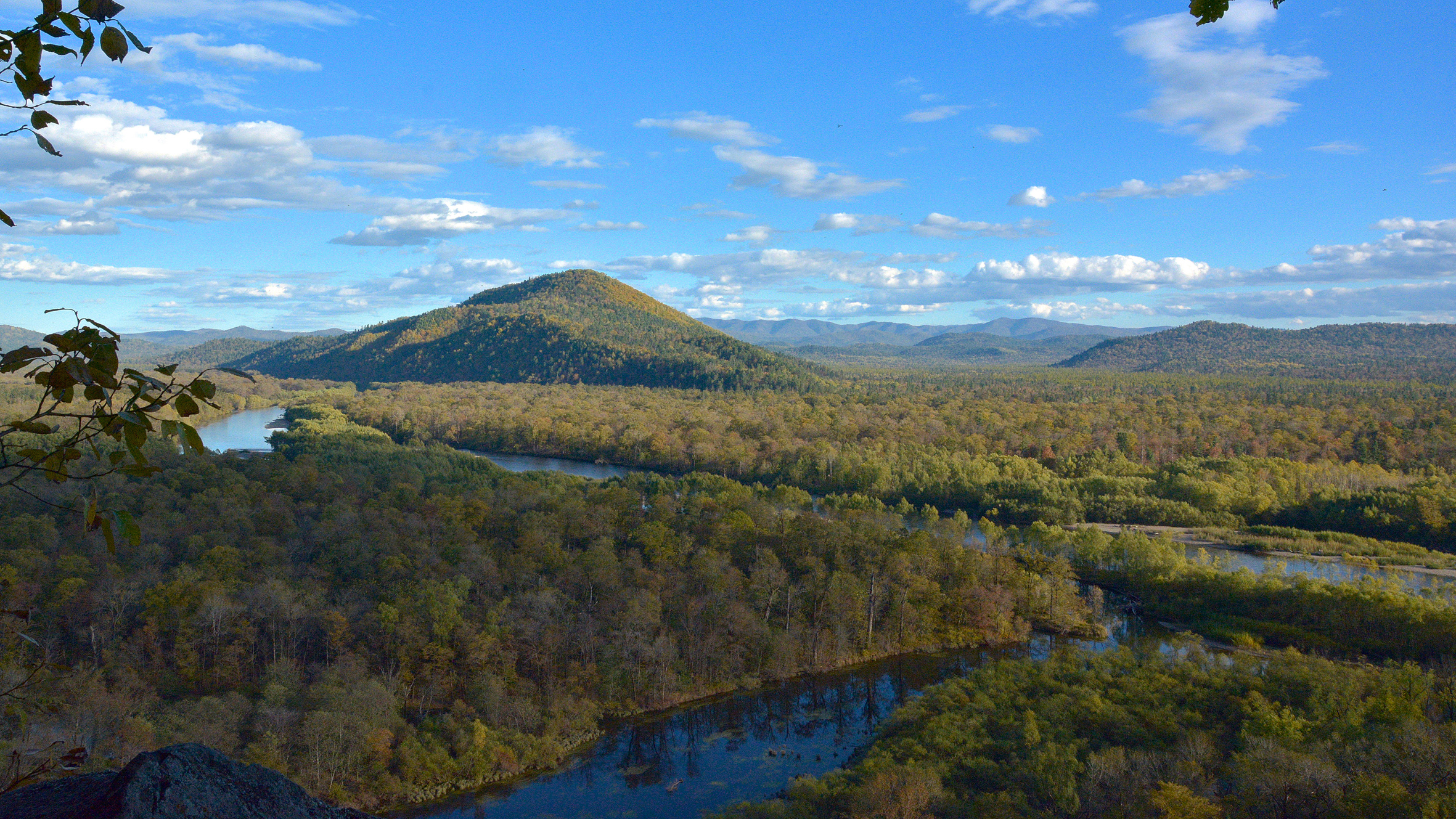
Temperate rainforest in Pozharsky District, Primorye

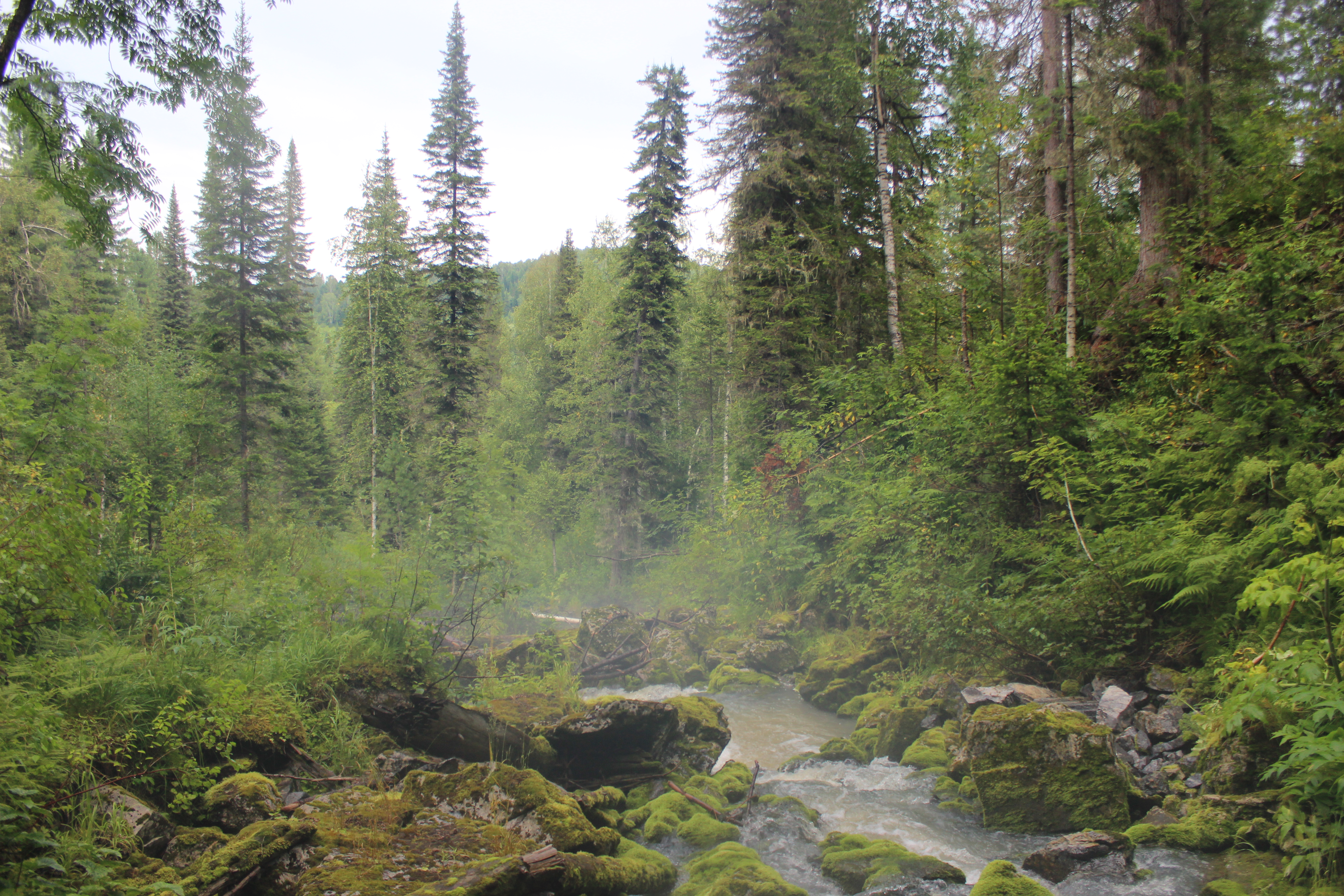
Taiga in Tashtagolsky District, Kemerovo Oblast

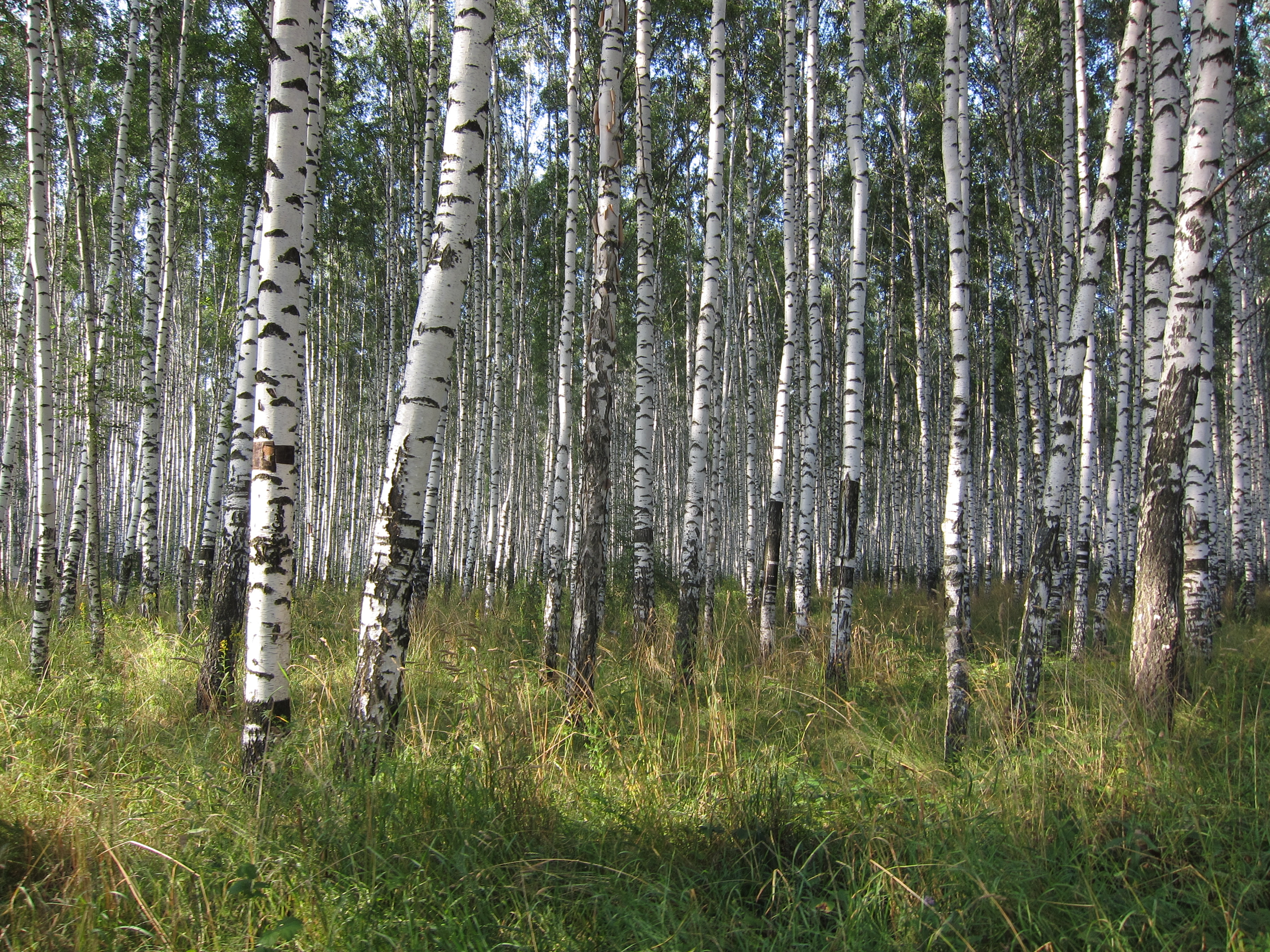
Birch forest in Arzamas, Nizhny Novgorod Oblast

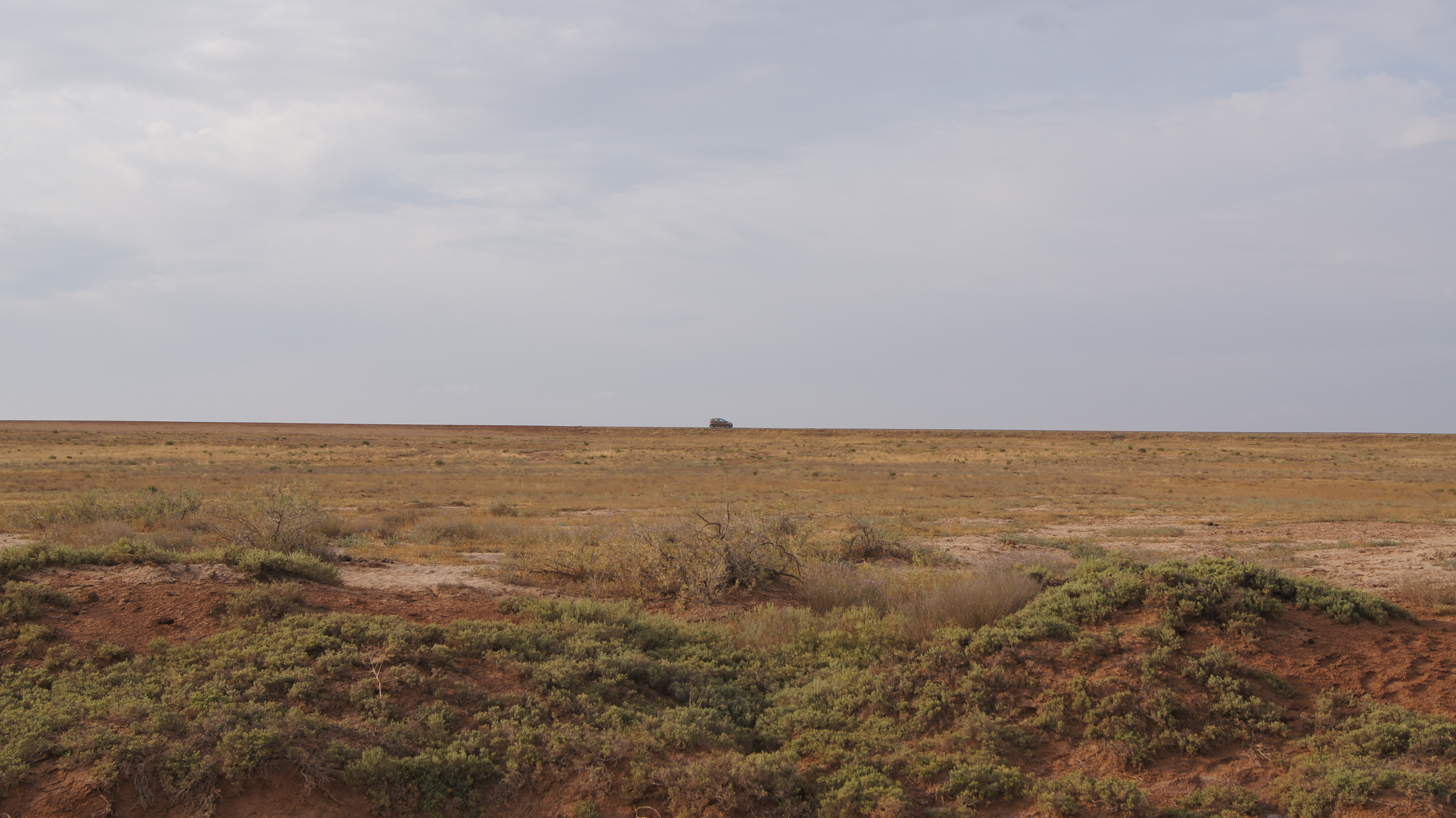
Semi-desert in Narimanovsky District, Astrakhan Oblast

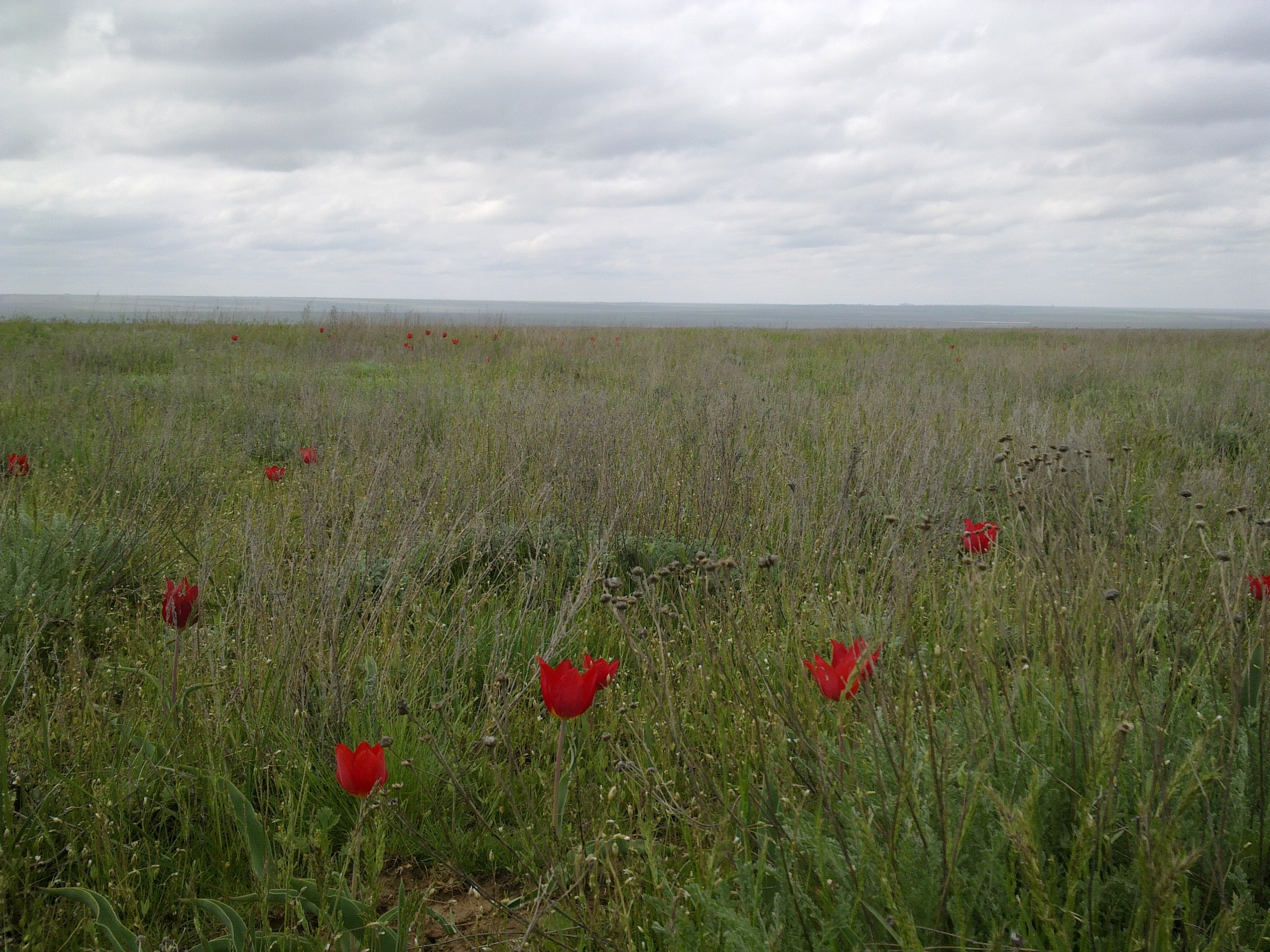
Steppe in Tselinny District, Kalmykia

Rank	Federal subject	Forested area
1	Irkutsk Oblast	82.6%
2	Primorsky Krai	77.2%
3	Kostroma Oblast	74.1%
4	Komi Republic	72.7%
5	Perm Krai	71.4%
6	Vologda Oblast	68.9%
7	Sverdlovsk Oblast	68.7%
8	Zabaykalsky Krai	68.3%
9	Sakhalin Oblast	68.0%
10	Khabarovsk Krai	66.3%
11	Amur Oblast	65.4%
12	Novgorod Oblast	64.1%
13	Buryatia	64.1%
14	Kirov Oblast	62.7%
15	Tomsk Oblast	61.4%
16	Kemerovo Oblast	59.8%
17	Leningrad Oblast	57.3%
18	Mari El	55.7%
19	Tver Oblast	54.7%
20	Arkhangelsk Oblast	54.1%
21	Khanty-Mansi Autonomous Okrug	53.9%
22	Karelia	53.1%
23	Vladimir Oblast	51.3%
24	Sakha	50.8%
25	Khakassia	49.8%
26	Tuva	49.7%
27	Nizhny Novgorod Oblast	47.8%
28	Ivanovo Oblast	46.2%
29	Udmurtia	46.2%
30	Yaroslavl Oblast	45.5%
31	Jewish Autonomous Oblast	45.2%
32	Krasnoyarsk Krai	45.1%
33	Kaluga Oblast	45.0%
34	Altai Republic	44.4%
35	Tyumen Oblast	44.0%
36	Moscow Oblast	42.8%
37	Kamchatka Krai	42.7%
38	Smolensk Oblast	41.9%
39	Bashkortostan	39.9%
40	Pskov Oblast	38.8%
41	Murmansk Oblast	37.4%
42	Magadan Oblast	37.4%
43	Adygea	36.7%
44	Sevastopol ^{[a]}	33.8%
45	Bryansk Oblast	32.9%
46	Omsk Oblast	32.3%
47	Chuvashia	32.2%
48	Karachay-Cherkessia	30.1%
49	Chelyabinsk Oblast	29.5%
50	Novosibirsk Oblast	27.3%
51	Mordovia	27.1%
52	Ulyanovsk Oblast	26.5%
53	North Ossetia-Alania	24.3%
54	Ryazan Oblast	23.6%
55	Altai Krai	22.8%
56	Kurgan Oblast	22.3%
57	Ingushetia	21.9%
58	Chechnya	20.9%
59	Yamalo-Nenets Autonomous Okrug	20.8%
60	Penza Oblast	20.5%
61	Krasnodar Krai	20.2%
62	Kaliningrad Oblast	18.6%
63	Tatarstan	17.5%
64	Kabardino-Balkaria	15.4%
65	Tula Oblast	14.3%
66	Saint Petersburg	13.7%
67	Samara Oblast	12.8%
68	Republic of Crimea ^{[a]}	10.7%
69	Tambov Oblast	10.5%
70	Belgorod Oblast	8.7%
71	Lipetsk Oblast	8.3%
72	Voronezh Oblast	8.2%
73	Kursk Oblast	8.2%
74	Oryol Oblast	8.0%
75	Dagestan	7.2%
76	Chukotka Autonomous Okrug	6.8%
77	Saratov Oblast	6.3%
78	Orenburg Oblast	4.6%
79	Volgograd Oblast	4.2%
80	Rostov Oblast	2.4%
81	Astrakhan Oblast	1.8%
82	Stavropol Krai	1.6%
83	Nenets Autonomous Okrug	1.1%
84	Kalmykia	0.2%

== See also ==
- List of countries by forest area
