= Silviculture =

Practice of controlling forests for timber production

Silviculture is the practice of controlling the growth, composition/structure, as well as quality of forests to meet values and needs, specifically timber production. The name comes from the Latin silvi- ('forest') and culture ('growing'). The study of forests and woods is termed silvology. Silviculture also focuses on making sure that the treatment(s) of forest stands are used to conserve and improve their productivity. The professional is known as silviculturist.

Generally, silviculture is the commercial business of growing and cultivating forest crops based on a knowledge of silvics, the study of the life history and general characteristics of forest trees and stands, with reference to local/regional factors. The focus of silviculture is the control, establishment and management of forest stands. The distinction between forestry and silviculture is that silviculture is applied at the stand-level, while forestry is a broader concept. Adaptive management is common in silviculture, while forestry can include natural/conserved land without stand-level management and treatments being applied.

== Silvicultural systems ==
The origin of forestry in German-speaking Europe has defined silvicultural systems broadly as high forest (Hochwald), coppice with standards (Mittelwald) and compound coppice, short rotation coppice, and coppice (Niederwald). There are other systems as well. These varied silvicultural systems include several harvesting methods, which are often wrongly said to be a silvicultural systems, but may also be called rejuvenating or regenerating method depending on the purpose.

The high forest system is further subdivided in German:

- High forest (Hochwald)
  - Age class forest (Altersklassenwald)
    - Even-aged forestry
      - Clear cutting (Kahlschlag)
      - Shelterwood cutting (Schirmschlag)
      - Seed-tree method
    - Uneven-aged forestry
      - The Femel selection cutting (group selection cutting) (Femelschlag)
      - Strip selection cutting (strip-and-group felling system) (Saumschlag)
      - Shelterwood wedge cutting (Schirmkeilschlag)
      - Mixed-form regeneration methods (Mischformen)
  - Continuous cover forestry (Dauerwald)
    - Uneven-aged forestry
      - Selection forest (Plenterwald)
      - Target diameter harvesting (Zielstärkennutzung)

These names give the impression is that these are neatly defined systems, but in practice there are variations within these harvesting methods in accordance with to local ecology and site conditions. While location of an archetypal form of harvesting technique can be identified (they all originated somewhere with a particular forester, and have been described in the scientific literature), and broad generalizations can be made, these are merely rules of thumb rather than strict blueprints on how techniques might be applied. This misunderstanding has meant that many older English textbooks did not capture the true complexity of silviculture as practiced where it originated in Mitteleuropa.

This silviculture was culturally predicated on wood production in temperate and boreal climates and did not deal with tropical forestry. The misapplication of this philosophy to those tropical forests has been problematic. There is also an alternative silvicultural tradition which developed in Japan and thus created a different biocultural landscape called satoyama.

After harvesting comes regeneration, which may be split into natural and artificial (see below), and tending, which includes release treatments, pruning, thinning and intermediate treatments. It is conceivable that any of these three phases (harvesting, regeneration, and tending) may happen at the same time within a stand, depending on the goal for that particular stand.

== Regeneration ==
Regeneration is basic to the continuation of forested, as well as to the afforestation of treeless land. Regeneration can take place through self-sown seed ("natural regeneration"), by artificially sown seed, or by planted seedlings. In whichever case, the performance of regeneration depends on its growth potential and the degree to which its environment allows the potential to be expressed. Seed, of course, is needed for all regeneration modes, both for natural or artificial sowing and for raising planting stock in a nursery.

The process of natural regeneration involves the renewal of forests by means of self-sown seeds, root suckers, or coppicing. In natural forests, conifers rely almost entirely on regeneration through seed. Most of the broadleaves, however, are able to regenerate by the means of emergence of shoots from stumps (coppice) and broken stems.

=== Seedbed requirements ===
Any seed, self-sown or artificially applied, requires a seedbed suitable for securing germination.

In order to germinate, a seed requires suitable conditions of temperature, moisture, and aeration. For seeds of many species, light is also necessary, and facilitates the germination of seeds in other species, but spruces are not exacting in their light requirements, and will germinate without light. White spruce seed germinated at 35 °F (1.7 °C) and 40 °F (4.4 °C) after continuous stratification for one year or longer and developed radicles less than 6 cm (2.4 in) long in the cold room. When exposed to light, those germinants developed chlorophyll and were normally phototropic with continued elongation.

For survival in the short and medium terms, a germinant needs: a continuing supply of moisture; freedom from lethal temperature; enough light to generate sufficient photosynthate to support respiration and growth, but not enough to generate lethal stress in the seedling; freedom from browsers, tramplers, and pathogens; and a stable root system. Shade is very important to the survival of young seedlings. In the longer term, there must be an adequate supply of essential nutrients and an absence of smothering.

In undisturbed forest, decayed windfallen stemwood provides the most favorable seedbed for germination and survival. Seedlings growing on such sites are less likely to be buried by accumulated snowpack and leaf litter, and less likely to be subject to flooding. Advantages conferred by those microsites include: more light, higher temperatures in the rooting zone, and better mycorrhizal development. According to a 1940 survey in the Porcupine Hills of Manitoba, approximately 90% of spruce seedlings were germinating from this substrate.

Mineral soil seedbeds are more receptive than the undisturbed forest floor, and are generally moister and more readily rewetted than the organic forest floor. However, exposed mineral soil, much more so than organic-surfaced soil, is subject to frost heaving and shrinkage during drought. The forces generated in soil by frost or drought are quite enough to break roots.

The range of microsites occurring on the forest floor can be broadened, and their frequency and distribution influenced by site preparation. Each microsite has its own microclimate. Microclimates near the ground are better characterized by vapour pressure deficit and net incident radiation, rather than the standard measurements of air temperature, precipitation, and wind pattern.

Aspect is an important component of microclimate, especially in relation to temperature and moisture regimes. Germination and seedling establishment of Engelmann spruce were much better on north than on south aspect seedbeds in the Fraser Experimental Forest, Colorado; the ratios of seeds to 5-year-old seedlings were determined as 32:1, 76:1, and 72:1 on north aspect bladed-shaded, bladed-unshaded, and undisturbed-shaded seedbeds, respectively. Clearcut openings of 1.2 to 2.0 hectares (3.0 to 4.9 acres) adjacent to an adequate seed source, and not more than 6 tree-heights wide, could be expected to secure acceptable regeneration (4,900, 5-year-old trees per hectare), whereas on undisturbed-unshaded north aspects, and on all seedbed treatments tested on south aspects, seed to seedling ratios were so high that the restocking of any clearcut opening would be questionable.

At least seven variable factors may influence seed germination: seed characteristics, light, oxygen, soil reaction (pH), temperature, moisture, and seed enemies. Moisture and temperature are the most influential, and both are affected by exposure. The difficulty of securing natural regeneration of Norway spruce and Scots pine in northern Europe led to the adoption of various forms of reproduction cuttings that provided partial shade or protection to seedlings from hot sun and wind. The main objective of echeloned strips or border-cuttings with northeast exposure was to protect regeneration from overheating, and was originated in Germany and deployed successfully by A. Alarik in 1925 and others in Sweden. On south and west exposures, direct insolation and heat reflected from tree trunks often result in temperatures lethal to young seedlings, as well as desiccation of the surface soil, which inhibits germination. The sun is less injurious on eastern exposures because of the lower temperature in the early morning, related to higher humidity and presence of dew.

In 1993, Henry Baldwin, after noting that summer temperatures in North America are often higher than those in places where border-cuttings have been found useful, reported the results of a survey of regeneration in a stand of red spruce plus scattered white spruce that had been isolated by clearcutting on all sides, so furnishing an opportunity for observing regeneration on different exposures in this old-field stand at Dummer, New Hampshire. The regeneration included a surprisingly large number of balsam fir seedlings from the 5% stand component of that species. The maximum density of spruce regeneration, determined 4 rods (20 m) inside from the edge of the stand on a north 20°E exposure, was 600,000/ha, with almost 100,000 balsam fir seedlings.

A prepared seedbed remains receptive for a relatively short period, seldom as long as 5 years, sometimes as short as 3 years. Seedbed receptivity on moist, fertile sites decreases with particular rapidity, and especially on such sites, seedbed preparation should be scheduled to take advantage of good seed years. In poor seed years, site preparation can be carried out on mesic and drier sites with more chance of success, because of the generally longer receptivity of seedbeds there than those on moister sites. Although an indifferent seed year can suffice if seed distribution is good and environmental conditions favourable to seedling germination and survival, small amounts of seed are particularly vulnerable to depredation by small mammals. Considerable flexibility is possible in timing site preparation to coincide with cone crops. Treatment can be applied either before any logging takes place, between partial cuts, or after logging. In cut and leave strips, seedbed preparation can be carried out as a single operation, pre-scarifying the leave strips, post-scarifying the cut strips.

Broadcast burning is not recommended as a method of preparing sites for natural regeneration, as it rarely exposes enough mineral soil to be sufficiently receptive, and the charred organic surfaces are a poor seedbed for spruce. A charred surface may get too hot for good germination and may delay germination until fall, with subsequent overwinter mortality of unhardened seedlings. Piling and burning of logging slash, however, can leave suitable exposures of mineral soil.

== Artificial regeneration ==
With a view to reducing the time needed to produce planting stock, experiments were carried out with white spruce and three other coniferous species from Wisconsin seed in the longer, frost-free growing season in Florida, 125 vs. 265 days in central Wisconsin and northern Florida, respectively. As the species studied are adapted to long photoperiods, extended daylengths of 20 hours were applied in Florida. Other seedlings were grown under extended daylength in Wisconsin and with natural daylength in both areas. After two growing seasons, white spruce under long days in Florida were about the same as those in Wisconsin, but twice as tall as plants under natural Wisconsin photoperiods. Under natural days in Florida, with the short local photoperiod, white spruce was severely dwarfed and had a low rate of survival. Black spruce responded similarly. After two growing seasons, long day plants of all 4 species in Florida were well balanced, with good development of both roots and shoots, equaling or exceeding the minimum standards for 2+1 and 2+2 outplanting stock of Lake States species. Their survival when lifted in February and outplanted in Wisconsin equalled that of 2+2 Wisconsin-grown transplants. Artificial extension of the photoperiod in the northern Lake States greatly increased height increment of white and black spruces in the second growing season.

Optimum conditions for seedling growth have been determined for the production of containerized planting stock. Alternating day/night temperatures have been found more suitable than a constant temperature; at 400 lumens/m^{2} light regime, a 28 °C/20 °C day/night temperatures have been recommended for white spruce. However, temperature optima are not necessarily the same at different ages and sizes. In 1984, R. Tinus investigated the effects of combinations of day and night temperature on height, caliper, and dry weight of 4 seed sources of Engelmann spruce. The 4 seed sources appeared to have very similar temperature requirements, with night optima about the same of slightly lower than daylight optima.

Tree provenance is important in artificial regeneration. Good provenance takes into account suitable tree genetics and a good environmental fit for planted / seeded trees in a forest stand. The wrong genotype can lead to failed regeneration, or poor trees that are prone to pathogens and undesired outcomes.

Artificial regeneration has been a more common method involving planting because it is more dependable than natural regeneration. Planting can involve using seedlings (from a nursery), (un)rooted cuttings, or seeds.

Whichever method is chosen it can be assisted by tending techniques also known as intermediate stand treatments.

The fundamental genetic consideration in artificial regeneration is that seed and planting stock must be adapted to the planting environment. Most commonly, the method of managing seed and stock deployment is through a system of defined seed zones, within which seed and stock can be moved without risk of climatic maladaptation. Ontario adopted a seed zone system in the 1970s based on G.A. Hills' 1952 site regions and provincial resource district boundaries, but Ontario's seed zones are now based on homogeneous climatic regions developed with the Ontario Climate Model. The regulations stipulate that source-identified seedlots may be either a general collection, when only the seed zone of origin is known, or a stand collection from a specific latitude and longitude. The movement of general-collection seed and stock across seed zone boundaries is prohibited, but the use of stand-collection seed and stock in another seed zone is acceptable when the Ontario Climate Model shows that the planting site and place of seed origin are climatically similar. The 12 seed zones for white spruce in Quebec are based mainly on ecological regions, with a few modifications for administrative convenience.

Seed quality varies with source. Seed orchards produce seed of the highest quality, then, in order of decreasing seed quality produced, seed production areas and seed collection areas follow, with controlled general collections and uncontrolled general collections producing the least characterized seed.

=== Seeds ===
==== Dewinging, extraction ====
When seed is first separated from cones it is mixed with foreign matter, often 2 to 5 times the volume of the seed. The more or less firmly attached membranous wings on the seed must be detached before it is cleaned of foreign matter. The testa must not incur damage during the dewinging process. Two methods have been used, dry and wet. Dry seed may be rubbed gently through a sieve that has a mesh through which only seed without wings can pass. Large quantities of seed can be processed in dewinging machines, which use cylinders of heavy wire mesh and rapidly revolving stiff brushes within to remove the wings. In the wet process, seed with wings attached are spread out 10 cm to 15 cm deep on a tight floor and slightly moistened throughout; light leather flails are used to free seed from the wings. B. Wang described a unique wet dewinging procedure in 1973 using a cement mixer, used at the Petawawa tree seed processing facility. Wings of white and Norway spruce seed can be removed by dampening the seed slightly before it is run through a fanning mill for the last time. Any moistened seed must be dried before fermentation or moulding sets in.

==== Seed viability ====
A fluorescein diacetate (FDA) biochemical viability test for several species of conifer seed, including white spruce, estimates the proportion of live seed (viability) in a seedlot, and hence the percentage germination of a seedlot. The accuracy of predicting percentage germination was within ± 5 for most seedlots. White spruce seed can be tested for viability by an indirect method, such as the fluorescein diacetate (FDA) test or 'Ultra-sound'; or by the direct growth method of 'germination'. Samples of white spruce seed inspected in 1928 varied in viability from 50% to 100%, but averaged 93%. A 1915 inspection reported 97% viability for white spruce seed.

==== Germinative testing ====
The results of a germination test are commonly expressed as germinative capacity or a germination percentage, which is the percentage of seeds that germinate during a period of time, ending when germination is practically complete. During extraction and processing, white spruce seeds gradually lost moisture, and total germination increased. Mittal et al. (1987) reported that white spruce seed from Algonquin Park, Ontario, obtained the maximum rate (94% in 6 days) and 99% total germination in 21 days after 14-week pre-chilling. The pre-treatment of 1% sodium hypochlorite increased germinability.

Encouraged by Russian success in using ultrasonic waves to improve the germinative energy and percentage germination of seeds of agricultural crops, Timonin (1966) demonstrated benefits to white spruce germination after exposure of seeds to 1, 2, or 4 minutes of ultrasound generated by an M.S.E. ultrasonic disintegrator with a power consumption of 280 VA and power impact of 1.35 amperes. However, no seeds germinated after 6 minutes of exposure to ultrasound.

==== Seed dormancy ====
Seed dormancy is a complex phenomenon and is not always consistent within species. Cold stratification of white spruce seed to break dormancy has been specified as a requirement, but Heit (1961) and Hellum (1968) regarded stratification as unnecessary. Cone handling and storage conditions affect dormancy in that cold, humid storage (5 °C, 75% to 95% relative humidity) of the cones prior to extraction seemingly eliminated dormancy by overcoming the need to stratify. Periods of cold, damp weather during the period of cone storage might provide natural cold (stratification) treatment. Once dormancy was removed in cone storage, subsequent kiln-drying and seed storage did not reactivate dormancy.

Haddon and Winston (1982) found a reduction in viability of stratified seeds after 2 years of storage and suggested that stress might have been caused by stratification, e.g., by changes in seed biochemistry, reduced embryo vigor, seed aging or actual damage to the embryo. They further questioned the quality of the 2-year-old seed even though high germination occurred in the samples that were not stratified.

==== Cold stratification ====
Cold stratification is the term applied to the storing of seeds in (and, strictly, in layers with) a moist medium, often peat or sand, with a view to maintaining viability and overcoming dormancy. Cold stratification is the term applied to storage at near-freezing temperatures, even if no medium is used. A common method of cold stratification, is to soak seed in tap water for up to 24 h, superficially dry it, then store moist for some weeks or even months at temperatures just above freezing. Although Hellum (1968) found that cold stratification of an Alberta seed source led to irregular germination, with decreasing germination with increasing length of the stratification period, Hocking's (1972) paired test with stratified and nonstratified Alberta seed from several sources revealed no trends in response to stratification. Hocking suggested that seed maturity, handling, and storage needed to be controlled before the need for stratification could be determined. Later, Winston and Haddon (1981) found that the storage of white spruce cones for 4 weeks at 5 °C prior to extraction obviated the need for stratification.

==== Seed ripeness ====
Seed maturity cannot be predicted accurately from cone flotation, cone moisture content, cone specific gravity; but the province of B.C. found embryo occupying 90% + of the corrosion cavity and megagametophyte being firm and whitish in colour are the best predictors for white spruce in B.C., and Quebec can forecast seed maturity some weeks in advance by monitoring seed development in relation to heat-sums and the phenological progression of the inflorescence of fireweed (Epilobium angustifolium L.), an associated plant species. Cone collection earlier than one week before seed maturity would reduce seed germination and viability during storage. Four stages of maturation were determined by monitoring carbohydrates, polyols, organic acids, respiration, and metabolic activity. White spruce seeds require a 6-week post-harvest ripening period in the cones to obtain maximum germinability, however, based on cumulative degree-days, seed from the same trees and stand showed 2-week cone storage was sufficient.

== Forest tree nurseries ==
See Plant nursery

== Forest tree plantations ==
=== Plantation establishment criteria ===
Plantations may be considered successful when outplant performance satisfies certain criteria. The term "free growing" is applied in some jurisdictions. Ontario's "Free-to-Grow" (FTG) equivalent relates to a forest stand that meets a minimum stocking standard and height requirement, and is essentially free of competition from surrounding vegetation that might impede growth. The FTG concept was introduced with the advent of the Forest Management Agreement program in Ontario in 1980 and became applicable to all management units in 1986. Policy, procedures, and methodologies readily applicable by forest unit managers to assess the effectiveness of regeneration programs were still under development during the Class Environmental Assessment hearings.

In British Columbia, the Forest Practices Code (1995) governs performance criteria. To minimize the subjectivity of assessing deciduous competition as to whether or not a plantation is established, minimum specifications of number, health, height, and competition have been specified in British Columbia. However, minimum specifications are still subjectively set and may need to be fine-tuned in order to avoid unwarranted delay in according established status to a plantation. For example, a vigorous white spruce with a strong, multi-budded leading shoot and its crown fully exposed to light on 3 sides would not qualify as free-growing in the current British Columbia Code but would hardly warrant description as unestablished.

== Competition ==
Competition arises when individual organisms are sufficiently close together to incur growth constraint through mutual modification of the local environment. Plants may compete for light, moisture and nutrients, but seldom for space per se. Vegetation management directs more of the site's resources into usable forest products, rather than just eliminating all competing plants. Ideally, site preparation ameliorates competition to levels that relieve the outplant of constraints severe enough to cause prolonged check.

The diversity of boreal and sub-boreal broadleaf-conifer mixed tree species stands, commonly referred to as the "mixedwoods", largely preclude the utility of generalizations and call for the development of management practices incorporating the greater inherent complexity of broadleaf-conifer mixtures, relative to single-species or mixed-species conifer forest. After harvesting or other disturbance, mixedwood stands commonly enter a prolonged period in which hardwoods overtop the coniferous component, subjecting them to intense competition in an understorey. It is well established that the regeneration and growth potential of understorey conifers in mixedwood stands is correlated to the density of competing hardwoods. To help apply "free-to-grow" regulations in British Columbia and Alberta, management guidelines based on distance-dependent relations within a limited radius of crop trees were developed, but Lieffers et al. (2002) found that free-growing stocking standards did not adequately characterize light competition between broadleaf and conifer components in boreal mixedwood stands, and further noted that adequate sampling using current approaches would be operationally prohibitive.

Many promising plantations have failed through lack of tending. Young crop trees are often ill-equipped to fight it out with competition resurgent following initial site preparation and planting.

Perhaps the most direct evaluation of the effect of competition on plantation establishment is provided by an effective herbicide treatment, given it is performed correctly and without contamination of waters of the state. The fact that herbicide treatment does not always produce positive results should not obscure the demonstrated potential of herbicides for significantly promoting plantation establishment. Factors that can vitiate the effectiveness of a herbicide treatment include: weather, especially temperature, prior to and during application; weather, especially wind, during application; weather, especially precipitation, in the 12 to 24 hours after application; vegetation characteristics, including species, size, shape, phenological stage, vigour, and distribution of weeds; crop characteristics, including species, phenology, and condition; the effects of other treatments, such as preliminary shearblading, burning or other prescribed or accidental site preparation; and the herbicide used, including dosage, formulation, carrier, spreader, and mode of application. There is a lot that can go wrong, but a herbicide treatment can be as good or better than any other method of site preparation.

=== Competition indices ===
The study of competition dynamics requires both a measure of the competition level and a measure of crop response. Various competition indices have been developed, e.g., by Bella (1971) and Hegyi (1974) based on stem diameter, by Arney (1972), Ek and Monserud (1974), and Howard and Newton (1984) based on canopy development, and Daniels (1976), Wagner (1982), and Weiner (1984) with proximity-based models. Studies generally considered tree response to competition in terms of absolute height or basal area, but Zedaker (1982) and Brand (1986) sought to quantify crop tree size and environmental influences by using relative growth measures.

== Tending ==
Tending is the term applied to pre-harvest silvicultural treatment of forest crop trees at any stage after initial planting or seeding. The treatment can be of the crop itself (e.g., spacing, pruning, thinning, and improvement cutting) or of competing vegetation (e.g., weeding, cleaning).

=== Planting ===
How many trees per unit area (spacing) that should be planted is not an easily answered question. Establishment density targets or regeneration standards have commonly been based on traditional practice, with the implicit aim of getting the stand quickly to the free-to-grow stage. Money is wasted if more trees are planted than are needed to achieve desired stocking rates, and the chance to establish other plantations is proportionately diminished. Ingress (natural regeneration) on a site is difficult to predict and often becomes surprisingly evident only some years after planting has been carried out. Early stand development after harvesting or other disturbance undoubtedly varies greatly among sites, each of which has its own peculiar characteristics.

For all practical purposes, the total volume produced by a stand on a given site is constant and optimum for a wide range of density or stocking. It can be decreased, but not increased, by altering the amount of growing stock to levels outside this range. Initial density affects stand development in that close spacing leads to full site utilization more quickly than wider spacing. Economic operability can be advanced by wide spacing even if total production is less than in closely spaced stands.

Beyond the establishment stage, the relationship of average tree size and stand density is very important. Various density-management diagrams conceptualizing the density-driven stand dynamics have been developed. Smith and Brand's (1988) diagram has mean tree volume on the vertical axis and the number of trees/ha on the horizontal axis: a stand can either have many little trees or a few big ones. The self-thinning line shows the largest number of trees of a given size/ha that can be carried at any given time. However, Willcocks and Bell (1995) caution against using such diagrams unless specific knowledge of the stand trajectory is known.

In the Lake States, plantations have been made with the spacing between trees varying from 3 by 3 to 10 by 10 feet (0.9 m by 0.9 m to 3.0 m by 3.0 m). Kittredge recommended that no fewer than 600 established trees per acre (1483/ha) be present during the early life of a plantation. To insure this, at least 800 trees per acre (1077/ha) should be planted where 85% survival may be expected, and at least 1200/ac (2970/ha) if only half of them can be expected to live. This translates into recommended spacings of 5 by 5 to 8 by 8 feet (1.5 m by 1.5 m to 2.4 m by 2.4 m) for plantings of conifers, including white spruce in the Lake States.

=== Enrichment planting ===
A strategy for enhancing natural forests' economic value is to increase their concentration of economically important, indigenous tree species by planting seeds or seedlings for future harvest, which can be accomplished with enrichment planting (EP).

=== Release treatments ===
- Weeding: A process of getting rid of saplings' or seedlings' competition by mowing, application of herbicide, or other method of removal from the surroundings.
- Cleaning: Release of select saplings from competition by overtopping trees of a comparable age. The treatment favors trees of a desired species and stem quality.
- Liberation cutting: A treatment that releases tree seedling or saplings by removing older overtopping trees.

=== Spacing ===
Over-crowded regeneration tends to stagnate. The problem is aggravated in species that have little self-pruning ability, such as white spruce. Spacing is a thinning (of natural regeneration), in which all trees other than those selected for retention at fixed intervals are cut. The term juvenile spacing is used when most or all of the cut trees are unmerchantable. Spacing can be used to obtain any of a wide range of forest management objectives, but it is especially undertaken to reduce density and control stocking in young stands and prevent stagnation, and to shorten the rotation, i.e., to speed the production of trees of a given size. Volume growth of individual trees and the merchantable growth of stands are increased. The primary rationale for spacing is that thinning is the projected decline in maximum allowable cut. And since wood will be concentrated on fewer, larger, and more uniform stems, operating and milling costs will be minimized.

Methods for spacing may be: manual, using various tools, including power saws, brush saws, and clippers; mechanical, using choppersand mulchers; chemical; or combinations of several methods. One treatment has had notable success in spacing massively overstocked (<100 000 stems/ha) natural regeneration of spruce and fir in Maine. Fitted to helicopter, the Thru-Valve boom emits herbicide spray droplets 1000 μm to 2000 μm in diameter at very low pressure. Swaths 1.2 m wide and leave strips 2.4 m wide were obtained with "knife-edge" precision when the herbicide was applied by helicopter flying at a height of 21 m at a speed of 40–48 km/h. It seems likely that no other method could be as cost-effective.

Twenty years after spacing to 2.5 × 2.5 m, 30-year-old mixed stands of balsam fir and white spruce in the Green River watershed, New Brunswick, averaged 156.9 m^{3}/ha.

A spacing study of 3 conifers (white spruce, red pine and jack pine) was established at Moodie, Manitoba, on flat, sandy, nutritionally poor soils with a fresh moisture regime. Twenty years after planting, red pine had the largest average dbh, 15% greater than jack pine, while white spruce dbh was less than half that of the pines. Crown width showed a gradual increase with spacing for all 3 conifers. Results to date were suggesting optimum spacings between 1.8 m and 2.4 m for both pines; white spruce was not recommended for planting on such sites.

Comparable data are generated by escapement trials, in which trees are planted at a range of densities. Spacings of 1.25 m, 1.50 m, 1.75 m, 2.00 m, 2.50 m, and 3.00 m on 4 site classes were used in the 1922 trial at Petawawa, Ontario. In the first of 34 old field white spruce plantations used to investigate stand development in relation to spacing at Petawawa, Ontario, regular rows were planted at average spacings of from 4 × 4 to 7 × 7 feet (1.22 m × 1.22 m to 2.13 m × 2.13 m). Spacings up to 10 × 10 feet (3.05 m × 3.03 m) were subsequently included in the study. Yield tables based on 50 years of data showed:

- Except for merchantable volumes at age 20 and site classes 50 and 60, closer spacings gave greater standing volumes at all ages than did wider spacings, the relative difference decreasing with age.
- Merchantable volume as a proportion of total volume increases with age, and is greater at wider than at closer spacings.
- Current annual volume increment culminates sooner at closer than at wider spacings.

A smaller espacement trial, begun in 1951 near Thunder Bay, Ontario, included white spruce at spacings of 1.8 m, 2.7 m, and 3.6 m. At the closest spacing, mortality had begun at 37 years, but not at the wider spacings.

The oldest interior spruce espacement trial in British Columbia was established in 1959 near Houston in the Prince Rupert Forest Region. Spacings of 1.2 m, 2.7 m, 3.7 m, and 4.9 m were used, and trees were measured 6, 12, 16, 26, and 30 years after planting. At wide espacements, trees developed larger diameters, crowns, and branches, but (at 30 years) basal area and total volume/ha were greatest in the closest espacement (Table 6.38). In more recent trials in the Prince George Region of British Columbia (Table 6.39) and in Manitoba, planting density of white spruce had no effect on growth after up to 16 growing seasons, even at spacings as low as 1.2 m. The slowness of juvenile growth and of crown closure delay the response to intra-competition. Initially, close spacing might even provide a positive nurse effect to offset any negative response to competition.

=== Thinning ===
Thinning is an operation that artificially reduces the number of trees growing in a stand with the aim of hastening the development of the remainder. The goal of thinning is to control the amount and distribution of available growing space. By altering stand density, foresters can influence the growth, quality, and health of residual trees. It also provides an opportunity to capture mortality and cull the commercially less desirable, usually smaller and malformed, trees. Unlike regeneration treatments, thinnings are not intended to establish a new tree crop or create permanent canopy openings.

Thinning greatly influences the ecology and micro-meteorology of the stand, lowering the inter-tree competition for water. The removal of any tree from a stand has repercussions on the remaining trees both above-ground and below. Silvicultural thinning is a powerful tool that can be used to influence stand development, stand stability, and the characteristics of the harvestable products.

Tending and thinning regimes and wind and snow damage are intimately related when considering intensive conifer plantations designed for maximum production.

Previous studies have demonstrated that repeated thinnings over the course of a forest rotation increase carbon stores relative to stands that are clear-cut on short rotations and that the carbon benefits differ according to thinning method (e.g., thinning from above versus below).

==== Precommercial thinning ====
In the early development of forest stand, density of trees remain high and there is competition among trees for nutrients. When natural regeneration or artificial seeding has resulted in dense, overstocked young stands, natural thinning will in most cases eventually reduce stocking to more silviculturally desirable levels. But by the time some trees reach merchantable size, others will be overmature and defective, and others will still be unmerchantable. To reduce this unbalance and to obtain more economic returns, in the early stage, one kind of cleaning is done which is known as precommercial thinning. Generally, one or two times precommercial thinning is done to facilitate the growth of the tree The yield of merchantable wood can be greatly increased and the rotation shortened by precommercial thinning. Mechanical and chemical methods have been applied, but their costliness has militated against their ready adoption.

=== Pruning ===
Pruning, as a silvicultural practice, refers to the removal of the lower branches of the young trees (also giving the shape to the tree) so clear knot-free wood can subsequently grow over the branch stubs. Clear knot-free lumber has a higher value. Pruning has been extensively carried out in the radiata pine plantations of New Zealand and Chile; however, the development of finger joint technology in the production of lumber and mouldings has led to many forestry companies reconsidering their pruning practices. Brashing is an alternative name for the same process. Pruning can be done to all trees, or more cost effectively to a limited number of trees. There are two types of pruning: natural or self-pruning and artificial pruning. Most cases of self-pruning happen when branches do not receive enough sunlight and die. Wind can also take part in natural pruning which can break branches. Artificial pruning is where people are paid to come and cut the branches. Or it can be natural, where trees are planted close enough that the effect is to cause self-pruning of low branches as energy is put into growing up for light reasons and not branchiness.

=== Stand Conversion ===
The term stand conversion refers to a change from one silvicultural system to another and includes species conversion, i.e., a change from one species (or set of species) to another. Such change can be effected intentionally by various silvicultural means, or incidentally by default e.g., when high-grading has removed the coniferous content from a mixedwood stand, which then becomes exclusively self-perpetuating aspen. In general, such sites as these are the most likely to be considered for conversion.

== Growth and yield ==
In discussing yields that might be expected from the Canadian spruce forests, Haddock (1961) noted that Wright's (1959) quotation of spruce yields in the British Isles of 220 cubic feet per acre (15.4 m^{3}/ha) per year and in Germany of 175 cubic feet per acre (12.25 m^{3}/ha) per year was misleading, at least if it was meant to imply that such yields might be approached in the Boreal Forest Region of Canada. Haddock thought that Wright's suggestion of 20 to 40 (average 30) cubic feet per acre (1.4 m^{3}/ha to 2.8 m^{3}/ha (average 2.1 m^{3}/ha) per year was more reasonable, but still somewhat optimistic.

The principal way forest resource managers influence growth and yield is to manipulate the mixture of species and number (density) and distribution (stocking) of individuals that form the canopy of the stand. Species composition of much of the boreal forest in North America already differs greatly from its pre-exploitation state. There is less spruce and more hardwoods in the second-growth forest than in the original forest; Hearnden et al. (1996) calculated that the spruce cover type had declined from 18% to only 4% of the total forested area in Ontario. Mixedwood occupies a greater proportion of Ontario's second-growth forest (41%) than in the original (36%), but its component of white spruce is certainly much diminished.

Growth performance is certainly influenced by site conditions and thus by the kind and degree of site preparation in relation to the nature of the site. It is important to avoid the assumption that site preparation of a particular designation will have a particular silvicultural outcome. Scarification, for instance, not only covers a wide range of operations that scarify, but also any given way of scarifying can have significantly different results depending on site conditions at the time of treatment. In point of fact, the term is commonly misapplied. Scarification is defined as "loosening the top soil of open areas, or breaking up the forest floor, in preparation for regenerating by direct seeding or natural seedfall", but the term is often misapplied to practices that include scalping, screefing, and blading, which pare off low and surface vegetation, together with most off its roots to expose a weed-free surface, generally in preparation for sowing or planting thereon.

Thus, it is not surprising that literature can be used to support the view that the growth of seedlings on scarified sites is much superior to that of growth on similar sites that have not been scarified, while other evidence supports the contrary view that scarification can reduce growth. Detrimental results can be expected from scarification that impoverishes the rooting zone or exacerbates edaphic or climatic constraints.

Burning site preparation has enhanced spruce seedling growth, but it must be supposed that burning could be detrimental if the nutrient capital is significantly depleted. An obvious factor greatly influencing regeneration is competition from other vegetation. In a pure stand of Norway spruce, for instance, Roussel (1948) found the following relationships:

Percent cover (%)	Vegetation Description
Below 1	No vegetation
1-3	Moss carpet with a few fir seedlings
4-10	Herbaceous plants appear
10-25	Bramble, herbs, fairly vigorous spruce seedlings
>25	Herbs, brambles very dense, vigorous, no moss

A factor of some importance in solar radiation–reproduction relationships is excess heating of the soil surface by radiation. This is especially important for seedlings, such as spruce, whose first leaves do not shade the base of the stem at the soil surface. Surface temperatures in sandy soils on occasion reach lethal temperatures of 50 °C to 60 °C.

== Harvesting and regeneration ==
Silvicultural regeneration methods combine both the harvest of the timber on the stand and re-establishment of the forest. The proper practice of sustainable forestry should mitigate the potential negative impacts, but all harvest methods will have some impacts on the land and residual stand. The practice of sustainable forestry limits the impacts such that the values of the forest are maintained in perpetuity. Silvicultural prescriptions are specific solutions to a specific set of circumstances and management objectives. Following are some common methods:

=== Clearcutting ===
Conventional clearcutting is relatively simple: all trees on a cutblock are felled and bunched with bunches aligned to the skidding direction, and a skidder then drags the bunches to the closest log deck. Feller-buncher operators concentrate on the width of the felled swath, the number of trees in a bunch, and the alignment of the bunch. Providing a perimeter boundary is felled during daylight, night-shift operations can continue without the danger of trespassing beyond the block. Productivity of equipment is maximized because units can work independently of one another.

Clearcutting is an even-aged regeneration method that can employ either natural or artificial regeneration. It involves the complete removal of the forest stand at one time. Clearcutting can be biologically appropriate with species that typically regenerate from stand replacing fires or other major disturbances, such as Lodgepole Pine (Pinus contorta). Alternatively, clearcutting can change the dominating species on a stand with the introduction of non-native and invasive species as was shown at the Blodgett Forest Research Station near Georgetown, California. Additionally, clearcutting can prolong slash decomposition, expose soil to erosion, impact visual appeal of a landscape and remove essential wildlife habitat. It is particularly useful in regeneration of tree species such as Douglas-fir (Pseudotsuga menziesii) which is shade intolerant.. In addition, the general public's distaste for even-aged silviculture, particularly clearcutting, is likely to result in a greater role for uneven-aged management on public lands as well. Across Europe, and in parts of North America, even-aged, production-orientated and intensively managed plantations are beginning to be regarded in the same way as old industrial complexes: something to abolish or convert to something else.

Clearcutting impacts many site factors important in their effect on regeneration, including air and soil temperatures. Kubin and Kemppainen (1991), for instance, measured temperatures in northern Finland from 1974 through 1985 in three clear-felled areas and in three neighbouring forest stands dominated by Norway spruce. Clear felling had no significant influence on air temperature at 2 m above the ground surface, but the daily air temperature maxima at 10 cm were greater in the clear-felled area than in the uncut forest, while the daily minima at 10 cm were lower. Night frosts were more common in the clear-felled area. Daily soil temperatures at 5 cm depth were 2 °C to 3 °C greater in the clear-felled area than in the uncut forest, and temperatures at depths of 50 cm and 100 cm were 3 °C to 5 °C greater. The differences between the clear-felled and uncut areas did not diminish during the 12 years following cutting.

=== Coppicing ===
Coppicing is a regeneration method which depends on the sprouting of cut trees. Most hardwoods, the coast redwood, and certain pines naturally sprout from stumps and can be managed through coppicing. Coppicing is generally used to produce fuelwood, pulpwood, and other products dependent on small trees. A close relative of coppicing is pollarding. Three systems of coppice woodland management are generally recognized: simple coppice, coppice with standards, and the coppice selection system. In Compound coppicing or coppicing with standards, some of the highest quality trees are retained for multiple rotations in order to obtain larger trees for different purposes.

=== Direct seeding ===
Prochnau (1963), four years after sowing, found that 14% of viable white spruce seed sown on mineral soil had produced surviving seedlings, at a seed:seedling ratio of 7.1:1. With Engelmann spruce, Smith and Clark (1960) obtained average seventh year seed:seedling ratios of 21:1 on scarified seedbeds on dry sites, 38:1 on moist sites, and 111:1 on litter seedbeds.

=== Group selection ===
The group selection method is an uneven-aged regeneration method that can be used when mid-tolerant species regeneration is desired. The group selection method can still result in residual stand damage in dense stands, however directional falling can minimize the damage. Additionally, foresters can select across the range of diameter classes in the stand and maintain a mosaic of age and diameter classes.

=== Méthode du contrôle ===
Classical European silviculture achieved impressive results with systems such as Henri Biolley's méthode du contrôle in Switzerland, in which the number and size of trees harvested were determined by reference to data collected from every tree in every stand measured every seven years.

While not designed to be applied to boreal mixedwoods, the méthode du contrôle is described briefly here to illustrate the degree of sophistication applied by some European foresters to the management of their forests. Development of management techniques that allowed for stand development to be monitored and guided into sustainable paths were in part a response to past experience, particularly in Central European countries, of the negative effects of pure, uniform stands with species often unsuited to the site, which greatly increased the risk of soil degradation and biotic diseases. Increased mortality and decreased increment generated widespread concern, especially after reinforcement by other environmental stresses.

More or less uneven-aged, mixed forests of preponderantly native species, on the other hand, treated along natural lines, have proved to be healthier and more resistant to all kinds of external dangers; and in the long run such stands are more productive and easier to protect.

However, irregular stands of this type are definitely more difficult to manage—new methods and techniques had to be sought particularly for the establishment of inventories, as well as increment control and yield regulation. In Germany, for instance, since the beginning of the nineteenth century under the influence of G.L. Hartig (1764–1837), yield regulation has been effected almost exclusively by allotment or formula methods based on the conception of the uniform normal forest with a regular succession of cutting areas.

In France, on the other hand, efforts were made to apply another kind of forest management, one that aimed to bring all parts of the forest to a state of highest productive capacity in perpetuity. In 1878, the French forester A. Gurnaud (1825–1898) published a description of a méthode du contrôle for determining increment and yield. The method was based on the fact that through careful, selective harvesting, the productivity of the residual stand can be improved, because timber is removed as a cultural operation. In this method, the increment of stands is accurately determined periodically with the object of gradually converting the forest, through selective management and continuous experimentation, to a condition of equilibrium at maximum productive capacity.

Henri Biolley (1858–1939) was the first to apply Gurnaud's inspired ideas to practical forestry. From 1890 on, he managed the forests of his Swiss district according to these principles, devoting himself for almost 50 years to the study of increment and a treatment of stands directed towards the highest production, and proving the practicability of the check method. In 1920, he published this study giving a theoretical basis of management of forests under the check method, describing the procedures to be applied in practice (which he partly developed and simplified), and evaluating the results.

Biolley's pioneering work formed the basis upon which most Swiss forest management practices were later developed, and his ideas have been generally accepted. Today, with the trend of intensifying forest management and productivity in most countries, the ideas and application of careful, continuous treatment of stands with the aid of the volume check method are meeting with ever-growing interest. In Britain and Ireland, for example, there is increased application of continuous cover forestry principles to create permanently irregular structures in many woodlands.

=== Row and broadcast seeding ===
Spot and row seeders use less seed that does broadcast ground or aerial seeding but may induce clumping. Row and spot seeding confer greater ability to control seed placement than does broadcast seeding. Also, only a small percentage of the total area needs to be treated.

In the aspen type of the Great Lakes region, direct sowing of the seed of conifers has usually failed. However, Gardner (1980) after trials in Yukon, which included broadcast seeding of white spruce seed at 2.24 kg/ha that secured 66.5% stocking in the Scarified Spring Broadcast treatment three years after seeding, concluded that the technique held "considerable promise".

=== Seed-tree ===
An even-aged regeneration method that retains widely spaced residual trees in order to provide uniform seed dispersal across a harvested area. In the seed-tree method, 2-12 seed trees per acre (5-30/ha) are left standing in order to regenerate the forest. They will be retained until regeneration has become established at which point they may be removed. It may not always be economically viable or biologically desirable to re-enter the stand to remove the remaining seed trees. Seed-tree cuts can also be viewed as a clearcut with natural regeneration and can also have all of the problems associated with clearcutting. This method is most suited for light-seeded species and those not prone to windthrow.

=== Selection systems ===
Selection systems are appropriate where uneven stand structure is desired, particularly where the need to retain continuous cover forest for aesthetic or environmental reasons outweighs other management considerations. Selection logging has been suggested as being of greater utility than shelterwood systems in regenerating old-growth Engelmann Spruce Sub-alpine Fir (ESSF) stands in southern British Columbia. In most areas, selection logging favours regeneration of fir more than the more light-demanding spruce. In some areas, selection logging can be expected to favour spruce over less tolerant hardwood species (Zasada 1972) or lodgepole pine.

=== Shelter spot seeding ===
The use of shelters to improve germination and survival in spot seedings seeks to capture the benefits of greenhouse culture, albeit miniature. The Hakmet seed shelter, for instance, is a semi-transparent plastic cone 8 cm high, with openings of 7 cm diameter in the 7.5 cm diameter base and 17 mm diameter in the 24 mm diameter top. This miniature greenhouse increases air humidity, reduces soil desiccation, and raises air and soil temperatures to levels more favourable to germination and seedling growth than those offered by unprotected conditions. The shelter is designed to break down after a few years of exposure to ultraviolet radiation.

Seed shelters and spring sowing significantly improved stocking compared with bare spot seeding, but sheltering did not significantly improve growth. Stocking of bare seedspots was extremely low, possibly due to smothering of seedlings by abundant broadleaf and herbaceous litter, particularly that from aspen and red raspberry, and exacerbated by strong competition from graminoids and raspberry.

Cone shelters (Cerkon) usually produced greater survival than unsheltered seeding on scarified seedspots in trials of direct seeding techniques in interior Alaska, and funnel shelters (Cerbel) usually produced greater survival than unsheltered seeding on non-scarified seedspots. Both shelter types are manufactured by AB Cerbo in Trollhättan, Sweden. Both are made of light-degradable, white, opaque plastic, and are 8 cm high when installed.

White spruce seed was sown in Alaska on a burned site in summer 1984, and protected by white plastic cones on small spots scarified by hand, or by white funnels placed directly into the residual ash and organic material. A group of six ravens (Corvus corax) was observed in the area about one week after sowing was completed in mid-June. Damage averaged 68% with cones and 50% with funnels on an upland area, and 26% with funnels on a floodplain area. Damage by ravens was only 0.13% on unburned but otherwise similar areas.

In seeding trials in Manitoba between 1960 and 1966 aimed at converting aspen stands to spruce–aspen mixedwoods, 1961 scarification in the Duck Mountain Provincial Forest remained receptive to natural seeding for many years.

=== Shelterwood ===
The Shelterwood system is a series of partial cuts that removes the trees of an existing stand over several years and eventually culminates in a final cut that creates a new even-aged stand. It is an even-aged regeneration method that removes trees in a series of three harvests: 1) Preparatory cut; 2) Establishment cut; and 3) Removal cut. The success of practising a shelterwood system is closely related to: 1. the length of the regeneration period, i.e. the time from the shelterwood cutting to the date when a new generation of trees has been established; 2.the quality of the new tree stand with respect to stand density and growth; and 3.the value increment of the shelter trees. Information on the establishment, survival and growth of seedlings influenced by the cover of shelter trees, as well as on the growth of these trees, is needed as a basis for modelling the economic return of practising a shelterwood system. The method's objective is to establish new forest reproduction under the shelter of the retained trees. Unlike the seed-tree method, residual trees alter understory environmental conditions (i.e. sunlight, temperature, and moisture) that influence tree seedling growth. This method can also find a middle ground with the light ambiance by having less light accessible to competitors while still being able to provide enough light for tree regeneration. Hence, shelterwood methods are most often chosen for site types characterized by extreme conditions, in order to create a new tree generation within a reasonable time period. These conditions are valid foremost on level ground sites which are either dry and poor or moist and fertile.

Shelterwood systems involve two, three, or exceptionally more partial cuttings. A final cut is made once adequate natural regeneration has been obtained. The shelterwood system is most commonly applied as a two-cut uniform shelterwood, first an initial regeneration (seed) cut, the second a final harvest cut. In stands less than 100 years old, a light preparatory cut can be useful. A series of intermediate cuts at intervals of 10–20 years has been recommended for intensively managed stands.

From operational or economic standpoints, however, there are disadvantages to the shelterwood system: harvesting costs are higher; trees left for deferred cutting may be damaged during the regeneration cut or related extraction operations; the increased risk of blowdown threatens the seed source; damage from bark beetles is likely to increase; regeneration may be damaged during the final cut and related extraction operations; the difficulty of any site preparation would be increased; and incidental damage to regeneration might be caused by any site preparation operations.

=== Single-tree selection ===
The single-tree selection method is an uneven-aged regeneration method most suitable when shade tolerant species regeneration is desired. It is typical for older and diseased trees to be removed, thus thinning the stand and allowing for younger, healthy trees to grow. Single-tree selection can be very difficult to implement in dense or sensitive stands and residual stand damage can occur. This method is also disturbs the canopy layer the least out of all other methods.

=== Spot seeding ===
Spot seeding is the most economical and reliable of the direct seeding methods for converting aspen and paper birch to spruce and pine. In the Chippewa National Forest (Lake States), seed-spot sowing of 10 seeds each of white spruce and white pine under 40-year aspen after different degrees of cutting on gave second-season results clearly indicating the need to remove or disturb the forest floor to obtain germination of seeded white spruce and white pine.

Spot seeding of coniferous seed, including white spruce, has had occasional success, but several constraining factors commonly limit germination success: the drying out of the forest floor before the roots of germinants reach underlying moisture reserves; and, particularly under hardwoods, the smothering of small seedlings by snow-pressed leaf litter and lesser vegetation. Kittredge and Gervorkiantz (1929) determined that removal of the aspen forest floor increased germination percentage after the second season in seed spots of both white pine and white spruce, in four plots, from 2.5% to 5%, from 8% to 22%, from 1% to 9.5%, and from 0% to 15%.

Spot seeding requires less seed than broadcast seeding and tends to achieve more uniform spacing, albeit sometimes with clumping. The devices used in Ontario for manual spot seeding are the "oil can" seeder, seeding sticks, and shakers. The oil can is a container fitted with a long spout through which a predetermined number of seeds are released with each flick of the seeder.

=== Strip cutting ===
Harvesting cutblocks where only a portion of the trees are to be removed is very different from clearcutting. First, trails must be located to provide access for the felling and skidding/forwarding equipment. These trails must be carefully located to ensure that the trees remaining meet the desired quality criteria and stocking density. Second, the equipment must not damage the residual stand. The further desiderata are outlined by Sauder (1995).

The dearth of seed and a deficiency of receptive seedbeds were recognized as major reasons for the lack of success of clearcut harvesting. One remedy attempted in British Columbia and Alberta has been alternate strip cutting. The greater seed source from uncut trees between the cut strips, and the disturbance to the forest floor within the cut strips could be expected to increase the amount of natural regeneration. Trees were cut to a diameter limit in the cut strips, but large trees in the leave strips often proved too much of a temptation and were cut too, thus removing those trees that would otherwise have been the major source of seed.

An unfortunate consequence of strip thinning was the build-up of spruce beetle populations. Shaded slash from the initial cut, together with an increase in the number of windthrown trees in the leave strips, provided conditions ideally suited to the beetle.

=== Underplanting ===
DeLong et al. (1991) suggested underplanting 30- to 40-year-old aspen stands, on the basis of the success of natural spruce in regenerating under stands of such stands: "By planting, spacing can be controlled enabling easier protection of the spruce during stand entry for harvesting of the aspen overstorey".

=== Variable retention ===
Variable retention is a harvesting and regeneration method which is a relatively new silvicultural system that retains forest structural elements (stumps, logs, snags, trees, understory species and undisturbed layers of forest floor) for at least one rotation in order to preserve environmental values associated with structurally complex forests.

"Uneven-aged and even-aged methods differ in the scale and intensity of disturbance. Uneven-aged methods maintain a mix of tree sizes or ages within a habitat patch by periodically harvesting individual or small groups of trees, Even-aged methods harvest most or all of the overstory and create a fairly uniform habitat patch dominated by trees of the same age". Even-aged management systems have been the prime methods to use when studying the effects on birds.

== Mortality ==
A survey in 1955–56 to determine survival, development, and the reasons for success or failure of conifer pulpwood plantations (mainly of white spruce) in Ontario and Quebec up to 32 years old found that the bulk of the mortality occurred within the first four years of planting, unfavourable site and climate being the main causes of failure.

== Advance growth ==
Naturally regenerated trees in an understorey prior to harvesting constitute a classic case of good news and bad news. Understorey white spruce is of particular importance in mixedwoods dominated by aspen, as in the B15, B18a, and B19a Sections of Manitoba, and elsewhere. Until the latter part of the last century, white spruce understorey was mostly viewed as money in the bank on a long-term, low interest deposit, with final yield to be realized after slow natural succession, but the resource became increasingly threatened with the intensification of harvesting of aspen. White spruce plantations on mixedwood sites proved expensive, risky, and generally unsuccessful. This prompted efforts to see what might be done about growing aspen and white spruce on the same landbase by protecting existing white spruce advance growth, leaving a range of viable crop trees during the first cut, then harvesting both hardwoods and spruce in the final cut. Information about the understorey component is critical to spruce management planning. The ability of then current harvesting technology and crews employed to provide adequate protection for white spruce understories was questioned by Brace and Bella. Specialized equipment and training, perhaps with financial incentives, may be needed to develop procedures that would confer the degree of protection needed for the system to be feasible. Effective understorey management planning requires more than improved mixedwood inventory.

Avoidance of damage to the understorey will always be a desideratum. Sauder's (1990) paper on mixedwood harvesting describes studies designed to evaluate methods of reducing non-trivial damage to understorey residuals that would compromise their chance of becoming a future crop tree. Sauder concluded that: (1) operational measures that protected residual stems may not unduly increase costs, (2) all felling, conifers and hardwoods, needs to be done in one operation to minimize the entry of the feller-buncher into the residual stand, (3) several operational procedures can reduce understorey damage, some of them without incurring extra costs, and (4) successful harvesting of treatment blocks depends primarily on the intelligent location of skid trails and landings. In summary, the key to protecting the white spruce understorey without sacrificing logging efficiency is a combination of good planning, good supervision, the use of appropriate equipment, and having conscientious, well-trained operators.Even the best plan will not reduce understorey damage unless its implementation is supervised.

New stands need to be established to provide for future supply of commercial white spruce from 150,000 ha of boreal mixedwoods in four of Rowe's (1972) regional Forest Sections straddling Alberta, Saskatchewan, and Manitoba, roughly from Peace River AB to Brandon MB. In the 1980s, with harvesting using conventional equipment and procedures, a dramatic increase in the demand for aspen posed a serious problem for the associated spruce understorey. Formerly, white spruce in the understories had developed to commercial size through natural succession under the protection of the hardwoods. Brace articulated a widespread concern: "The need for protection of spruce as a component of boreal mixedwoods goes beyond concern for the future commercial softwood timber supply. Concerns also include fisheries and wildlife habitat, aesthetics and recreation, a general dissatisfaction with clearcutting in mixedwoods and a strong interest in mixedwood perpetuation, as expressed recently in 41 public meetings on forestry development in northern Alberta...".

On the basis of tests of three logging systems in Alberta, Brace (1990) affirmed that significant amounts of understorey can be retained using any of those systems provided that sufficient effort is directed towards protection. Potential benefits would include increased short-term softwood timber supply, improved wildlife habitat and cutblock aesthetics, as well as reduced public criticism of previous logging practices. Stewart et al. (2001) developed statistical models to predict the natural establishment and height growth of understorey white spruce in the boreal mixedwood forest in Alberta using data from 148 permanent sample plots and supplementary information about height growth of white spruce regeneration and the amount and type of available substrate. A discriminant model correctly classified 73% of the sites as to presence or absence of a white spruce understorey, based on the amount of spruce basal area, rotten wood, ecological nutrient regime, soil clay fraction, and elevation, although it explained only 30% of the variation in the data. On sites with a white spruce understorey, a regression model related the abundance of regeneration to rotten wood cover, spruce basal area, pine basal area, soil clay fraction, and grass cover (R² = 0.36). About half the seedlings surveyed grew on rotten wood, and only 3% on mineral soil, and seedlings were ten times more likely to have established on these substrates than on litter. Exposed mineral soil covered only 0.3% of the observed transect area.

=== Advance growth management ===
Advance growth management, i.e., the use of suppressed understorey trees, can reduce reforestation costs, shorten rotations, avoid denuding the site of trees, and also reduce adverse impacts on aesthetic, wildlife, and watershed values. To be of value, advance growth must have acceptable species composition and distribution, have potential for growth following release, and not be vulnerable to excessive damage from logging.

The age of advance growth is difficult to estimate from its size, as white that appears to be two- to three-year-old may well be more than twenty years old. However, age does not seem to determine the ability of advance growth of spruce to respond to release, and trees older than 100 years have shown rapid rates of growth after release. Nor is there a clear relationship between the size of advance growth and its growth rate when released.

Where advance growth consists of both spruce and fir, the latter is apt to respond to release more quickly than the former, whereas spruce does respond. If the ratio of fir to spruce is large, however, the greater responsiveness to release of fir may subject the spruce to competition severe enough to negate much of the effect of release treatment. Even temporary relief from shrub competition has increased height growth rates of white spruce in northwestern New Brunswick, enabling the spruce to overtop the shrubs.

== Site preparation ==
Site preparation is any of various treatments applied to a site in order to ready it for seeding or planting. The purpose is to facilitate the regeneration of that site by the chosen method. Site preparation may be designed to achieve, singly or in any combination: improved access, by reducing or rearranging slash, and amelioration of adverse forest floor, soil, vegetation, or other biotic factors. Site preparation is undertaken to ameliorate one or more constraints that would otherwise be likely to thwart the objectives of management. A valuable bibliography on the effects of soil temperature and site preparation on subalpine and boreal tree species has been prepared by McKinnon et al. (2002).

Site preparation is the work that is done before a forest area is regenerated. Some types of site preparation are burning.

=== Burning ===
Broadcast burning is commonly used to prepare clearcut sites for planting, e.g., in central British Columbia, and in the temperate region of North America generally.

Prescribed burning is carried out primarily for slash hazard reduction and to improve site conditions for regeneration; all or some of the following benefits may accrue:

a) Reduction of logging slash, plant competition, and humus prior to direct seeding, planting, scarifying or in anticipation of natural seeding in partially cut stands or in connection with seed-tree systems.
b) Reduction or elimination of unwanted forest cover prior to planting or seeding, or prior to preliminary scarification thereto.
c) Reduction of humus on cold, moist sites to favour regeneration.
d) Reduction or elimination of slash, grass, or brush fuels from strategic areas around forested land to reduce the chances of damage by wildfire.

Prescribed burning for preparing sites for direct seeding was tried on a few occasions in Ontario, but none of the burns was hot enough to produce a seedbed that was adequate without supplementary mechanical site preparation.

Changes in soil chemical properties associated with burning include significantly increased pH, which Macadam (1987) in the Sub-boreal Spruce Zone of central British Columbia found persisting more than a year after the burn. Average fuel consumption was 20 to 24 t/ha and the forest floor depth was reduced by 28% to 36%. The increases correlated well with the amounts of slash (both total and ≥7 cm diameter) consumed. The change in pH depends on the severity of the burn and the amount consumed; the increase can be as much as two units, a hundred-fold change. Deficiencies of copper and iron in the foliage of white spruce on burned clearcuts in central British Columbia might be attributable to elevated pH levels.

Even a broadcast slash fire in a clearcut does not give a uniform burn over the whole area. Tarrant (1954), for instance, found only 4% of a 140-ha slash burn had burned severely, 47% had burned lightly, and 49% was unburned. Burning after windrowing obviously accentuates the subsequent heterogeneity.

Marked increases in exchangeable calcium also correlated with the amount of slash at least 7 cm in diameter consumed. Phosphorus availability also increased, both in the forest floor and in the 0 cm to 15 cm mineral soil layer, and the increase was still evident, albeit somewhat diminished, 21 months after burning. However, in another study in the same Sub-boreal Spruce Zone found that although it increased immediately after the burn, phosphorus availability had dropped to below pre-burn levels within nine months.

Nitrogen will be lost from the site by burning, though concentrations in remaining forest floor were found by Macadam (1987) to have increased in two of six plots, the others showing decreases. Nutrient losses may be outweighed, at least in the short term, by improved soil microclimate through the reduced thickness of forest floor where low soil temperatures are a limiting factor.

The Picea/Abies forests of the Alberta foothills are often characterized by deep accumulations of organic matter on the soil surface and cold soil temperatures, both of which make reforestation difficult and result in a general deterioration in site productivity; Endean and Johnstone (1974) describe experiments to test prescribed burning as a means of seedbed preparation and site amelioration on representative clear-felled Picea/Abies areas. Results showed that, in general, prescribed burning did not reduce organic layers satisfactorily, nor did it increase soil temperature, on the sites tested. Increases in seedling establishment, survival, and growth on the burned sites were probably the result of slight reductions in the depth of the organic layer, minor increases in soil temperature, and marked improvements in the efficiency of the planting crews. Results also suggested that the process of site deterioration has not been reversed by the burning treatments applied.

=== Ameliorative intervention ===
Slash weight (the oven-dry weight of the entire crown and that portion of the stem < 4 inches in diameter) and size distribution are major factors influencing the forest fire hazard on harvested sites. Forest managers interested in the application of prescribed burning for hazard reduction and silviculture, were shown a method for quantifying the slash load by Kiil (1968). In west-central Alberta, he felled, measured, and weighed 60 white spruce, graphed (a) slash weight per merchantable unit volume against diameter at breast height (dbh), and (b) weight of fine slash (<1.27 cm) also against dbh, and produced a table of slash weight and size distribution on one acre of a hypothetical stand of white spruce. When the diameter distribution of a stand is unknown, an estimate of slash weight and size distribution can be obtained from average stand diameter, number of trees per unit area, and merchantable cubic foot volume. The sample trees in Kiil's study had full symmetrical crowns. Densely growing trees with short and often irregular crowns would probably be overestimated; open-grown trees with long crowns would probably be underestimated.

The need to provide shade for young outplants of Engelmann spruce in the high Rocky Mountains is emphasized by the U.S. Forest Service. Acceptable planting spots are defined as microsites on the north and east sides of down logs, stumps, or slash, and lying in the shadow cast by such material. Where the objectives of management specify more uniform spacing, or higher densities, than obtainable from an existing distribution of shade-providing material, redistribution or importing of such material has been undertaken.

=== Access ===
Site preparation on some sites might be done simply to facilitate access by planters, or to improve access and increase the number or distribution of microsites suitable for planting or seeding.

Wang et al. (2000) determined field performance of white and black spruces eight and nine years after outplanting on boreal mixedwood sites following site preparation (Donaren disc trenching versus no trenching) in two plantation types (open versus sheltered) in southeastern Manitoba. Donaren trenching slightly reduced the mortality of black spruce but significantly increased the mortality of white spruce. Significant difference in height was found between open and sheltered plantations for black spruce but not for white spruce, and root collar diameter in sheltered plantations was significantly larger than in open plantations for black spruce but not for white spruce. Black spruce open plantation had significantly smaller volume (97 cm^{3}) compared with black spruce sheltered (210 cm^{3}), as well as white spruce open (175 cm^{3}) and sheltered (229 cm^{3}) plantations. White spruce open plantations also had smaller volume than white spruce sheltered plantations. For transplant stock, strip plantations had a significantly higher volume (329 cm^{3}) than open plantations (204 cm^{3}). Wang et al. (2000) recommended that sheltered plantation site preparation should be used.

=== Mechanical ===
Up to 1970, no "sophisticated" site preparation equipment had become operational in Ontario, but the need for more efficacious and versatile equipment was increasingly recognized. By this time, improvements were being made to equipment originally developed by field staff, and field testing of equipment from other sources was increasing.

According to J. Hall (1970), in Ontario at least, the most widely used site preparation technique was post-harvest mechanical scarification by equipment front-mounted on a bulldozer (blade, rake, V-plow, or teeth), or dragged behind a tractor (Imsett or S.F.I. scarifier, or rolling chopper). Drag type units designed and constructed by Ontario's Department of Lands and Forests used anchor chain or tractor pads separately or in combination, or were finned steel drums or barrels of various sizes and used in sets alone or combined with tractor pad or anchor chain units.

J. Hall's (1970) report on the state of site preparation in Ontario noted that blades and rakes were found to be well suited to post-cut scarification in tolerant hardwood stands for natural regeneration of yellow birch. Plows were most effective for treating dense brush prior to planting, often in conjunction with a planting machine. Scarifying teeth, e.g., Young's teeth, were sometimes used to prepare sites for planting, but their most effective use was found to be preparing sites for seeding, particularly in backlog areas carrying light brush and dense herbaceous growth. Rolling choppers found application in treating heavy brush but could be used only on stone-free soils. Finned drums were commonly used on jack pine–spruce cutovers on fresh brushy sites with a deep duff layer and heavy slash, and they needed to be teamed with a tractor pad unit to secure good distribution of the slash. The S.F.I. scarifier, after strengthening, had been "quite successful" for two years, promising trials were under way with the cone scarifier and barrel ring scarifier, and development had begun on a new flail scarifier for use on sites with shallow, rocky soils. Recognition of the need to become more effective and efficient in site preparation led the Ontario Department of Lands and Forests to adopt the policy of seeking and obtaining for field testing new equipment from Scandinavia and elsewhere that seemed to hold promise for Ontario conditions, primarily in the north. Thus, testing was begun of the Brackekultivator from Sweden and the Vako-Visko rotary furrower from Finland.

According to J. Charton and A. Peterson, motormanual scarification is best suited for small restoration projects (less than 25,000 trees) or in ecologically sensitive areas such as riparian zones or areas that are prone to erosion.

According to J. Charton, scarification intensity can effect first year seedling mortality and growth. Scarification should be properly applied to various site conditions to ensure that it works in a positive manner for planted seedlings. Since both fireweed and bluejoint grass were shown as soil moisture moderators, reduced scarification intensity may be beneficial to planted seedlings in the wetter areas found on the Kenai Peninsula. However, other factors such as encouraging natural regeneration to promote pre-beetle species compositions should be considered. Reforestation managers should balance response to scarification in wet areas to achieve the proper balance between planted seedling survival and growth and achieving the desired level of natural regeneration.

=== Mounding ===
Site preparation treatments that create raised planting spots have commonly improved outplant performance on sites subject to low soil temperature and excess soil moisture. Mounding can certainly have a big influence on soil temperature. Draper et al. (1985), for instance, documented this as well as the effect it had on root growth of outplants (Table 30).

The mounds warmed up quickest, and at soil depths of 0.5 cm and 10 cm averaged 10 and 7 °C higher, respectively, than in the control. On sunny days, daytime surface temperature maxima on the mound and organic mat reached 25 °C to 60 °C, depending on soil wetness and shading. Mounds reached mean soil temperatures of 10 °C at 10 cm depth five days after planting, but the control did not reach that temperature until fifty-eight days after planting. During the first growing season, mounds had three times as many days with a mean soil temperature greater than 10 °C than did the control microsites.

Draper et al.'s (1985) mounds received five times the amount of photosynthetically active radiation (PAR) summed over all sampled microsites throughout the first growing season; the control treatment consistently received about 14% of daily background PAR, while mounds received over 70%. By November, fall frosts had reduced shading, eliminating the differential. Quite apart from its effect on temperature, incident radiation is also important photosynthetically. The average control microsite was exposed to levels of light above the compensation point for only three hours, i.e., one-quarter of the daily light period, whereas mounds received light above the compensation point for eleven hours, i.e., 86% of the same daily period. Assuming that incident light in the 100-600 μE/m^{2}/s intensity range is the most important for photosynthesis, the mounds received over four times the total daily light energy that reached the control microsites.

=== Orientation of linear site preparation, e.g., disk-trenching ===
With linear site preparation, orientation is sometimes dictated by topography or other considerations, but where the orientation can be chosen, it can make a significant difference. A disk-trenching experiment in the Sub-boreal Spruce Zone in interior British Columbia investigated the effect on growth of young outplants (lodgepole pine) in 13 microsite planting positions: berm, hinge, and trench; in north, south, east, and west aspects, as well as in untreated locations between the furrows. Tenth-year stem volumes of trees on south, east, and west-facing microsites were significantly greater than those of trees on north-facing and untreated microsites. However, planting spot selection was seen to be more important overall than trench orientation.

In a Minnesota study, the N–S strips accumulated more snow, but the snow melted faster than on E–W strips in the first year after felling. Snow-melt was faster on strips near the centre of the strip-felled area than on border strips adjoining the intact stand. The strips, 50 feet (15.24 m) wide, alternating with uncut strips 16 feet (4.88 m) wide, were felled in a Pinus resinosa stand, aged 90 to 100 years.

== See also ==
- Agroforestry
- Coppicing
- Dehesa
- Ecological thinning
- Forest dynamics
- Forestry
- Forest management
- History of the forest in Central Europe
- Hardwood timber production
- Live crown
- Natural landscape
- Permaculture
- Plantations
- Populiculture
- Seed tree
- Selection cutting
- Silvology
- Sustainable forest management
- World Forestry Congress
