= Mixedwood stand =

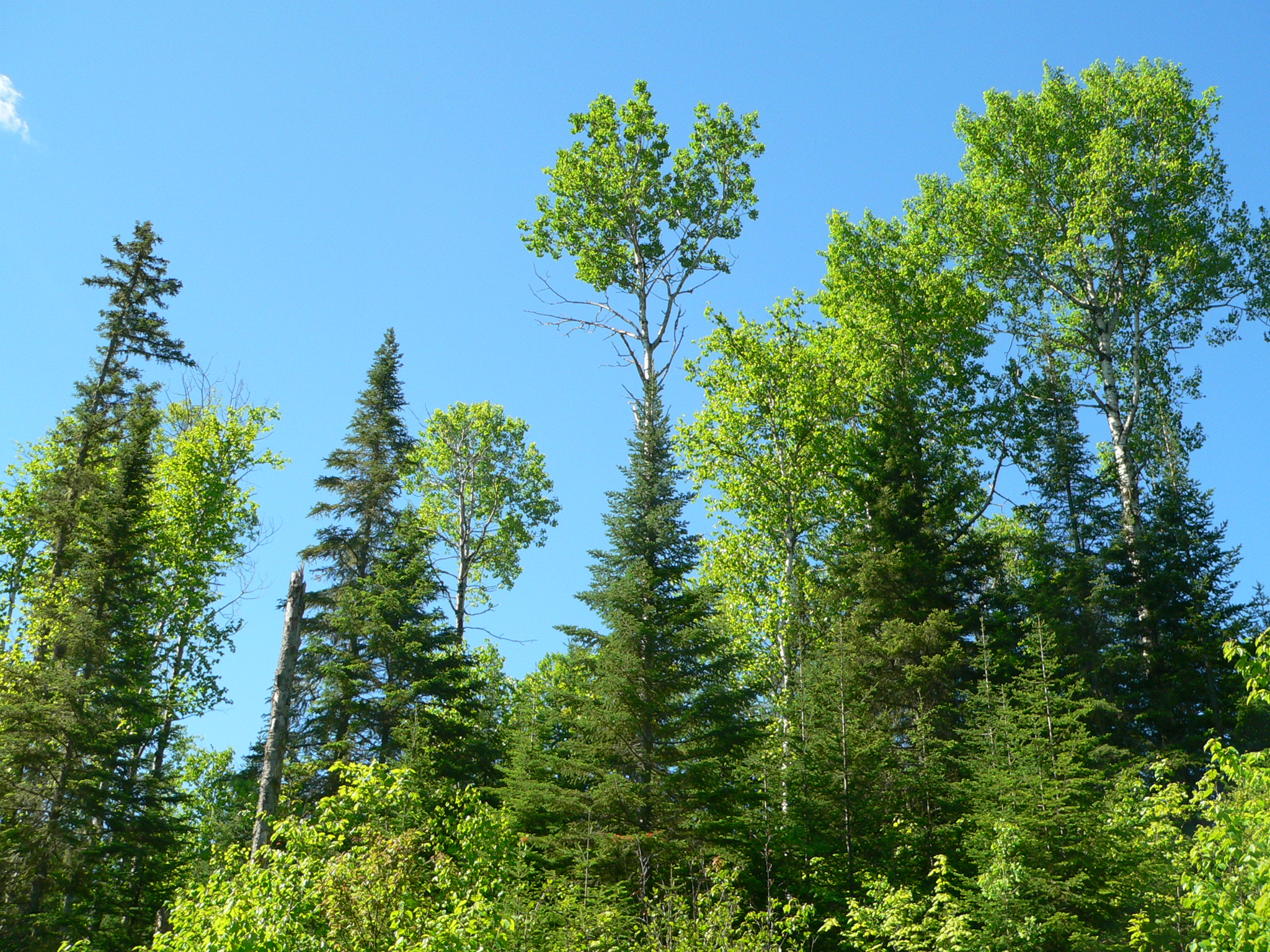
Boreal mixedwood stand in Quebec, Canada

A mixedwood stand is a forest type in which the canopy is made up of a mixture of softwood trees and hardwood trees, with at least 25% of the canopy being represented by both types. The term is commonly used by forestry professionals in Canadian jurisdictions requiring forest management approaches that consider the silvicultural needs of both forest types.

== Ontario ==
Ontario has two major forest biomes that are actively managed; the Boreal and Great Lakes - St Lawrence Lowlands. The southern extremes of the province include elements of the Carolinian forest, but are in small, sparse pockets that are rarely managed at a large scale. The biomes have different tree species that have different habitat needs. The boreal tree species are primarily black spruce, jack pine, white birch and poplar. The Great Lakes - St Lawrence Lowlands tree species include boreal species, but also add Eastern White Pine, eastern hemlock, maples, beech and oaks to the mix. Mixedwood stands are composed of broad mixtures of these species.

Forest management approaches in Ontario are largely defined by the Crown Forest Sustainability Act.

== Prairie Provinces ==
The white spruce–aspen mixedwood forest type is common in the Prairie Provinces. These mixedwood stands have a variety of compositions ranging from pure aspen to pure white spruce, to mixtures of both. Balsam poplar, white birch, black spruce, balsam fir, and pines may also occur. Silvicultural treatments have generally been aimed at promoting white spruce, primarily through plantation establishment and management. The type of stand of a given association is as much a product of successional stage and stand history as it is of site type. Depending on seed source and seedbed conditions, recruitment of white spruce may begin relatively soon after disturbance or may be spread over many decades. A major ecological factor in mixedwood management is the spruce budworm; another is the problem of providing for sufficient spruce regeneration.

Management of mixedwoods in the Prairie Provinces in the 1990s usually used clearcutting. When aspen is the main species to be regenerated, little treatment is applied to the site, but slash piles, compaction of soil, and damage to aspen root systems are minimized as much as is feasible in order to encourage suckering. In the coniferous harvest, aspen that is not harvested is usually left standing to reduce suckering, as well as for the benefit of wildlife. Regeneration of white spruce is more difficult. In general, plantation techniques are used, with mechanical site preparation following clearcutting. Depending on site conditions and availability of equipment, disk trenching, double disking, blading, ripper, or Marttiini plowing, Bracke spot scarification, high-speed mixing, or spot mounding are used. Plantings of white spruce have come to favour the use of large container or transplant stock. In the early years after clearcutting, site preparation and planting, shade-intolerant vegetation, such as aspen, Calamagrostis canadensis, and green alder compete strongly with the young outplants, frequently causing death.
