= Shelterwood cutting =

Silvicultural method

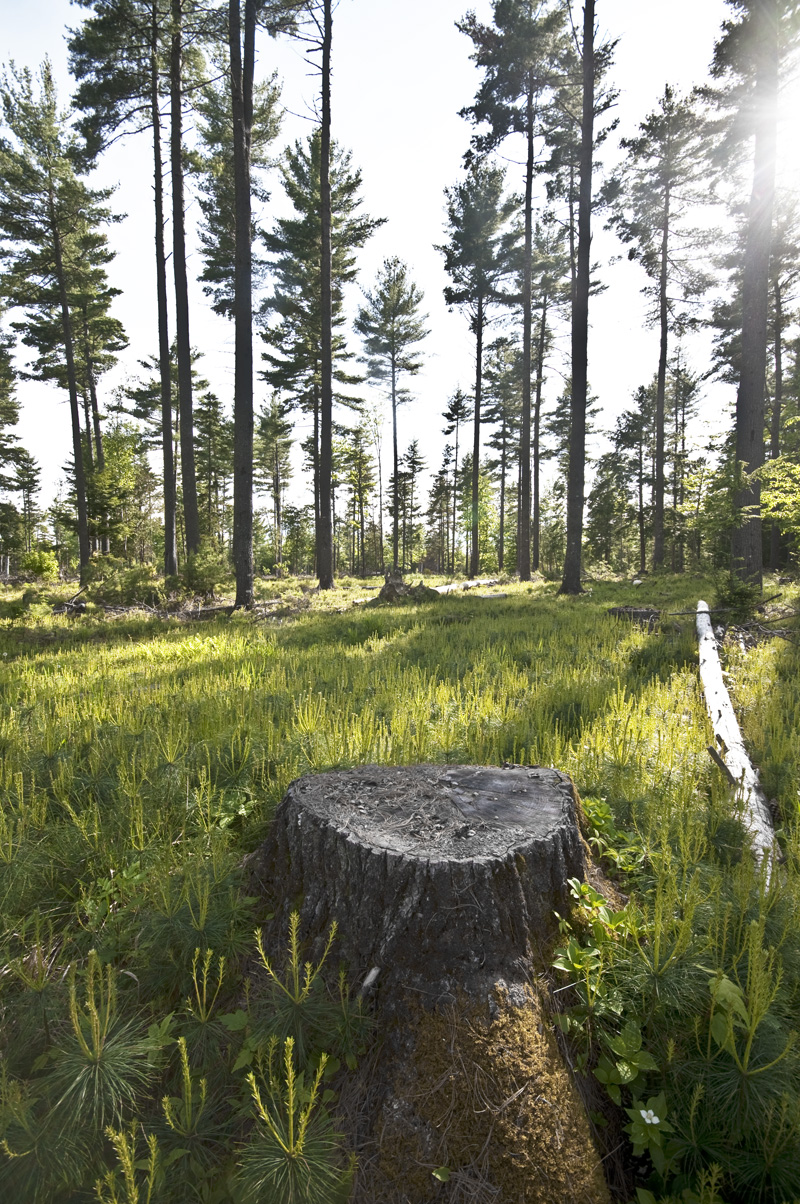
A shelterwood establishment cut in an eastern white pine stand in Maine.

Shelterwood cutting removes part of the old forest stand to allow for a natural establishment of seedlings under the cover of the remaining trees. Initial cuttings give just enough light to allow for the regeneration of desired species. Subsequent cuttings give the new seedlings more light and fully pass the growing space to the new generation. Shelterwood systems have many variations and can be adapted to site conditions and the goals of the landowner. There are concerns associated with this silvicultural system due to windthrow and high costs as well as advantages due to improved aesthetics and cost savings from natural regeneration.

== Cutting stages ==
=== Preparatory cut ===
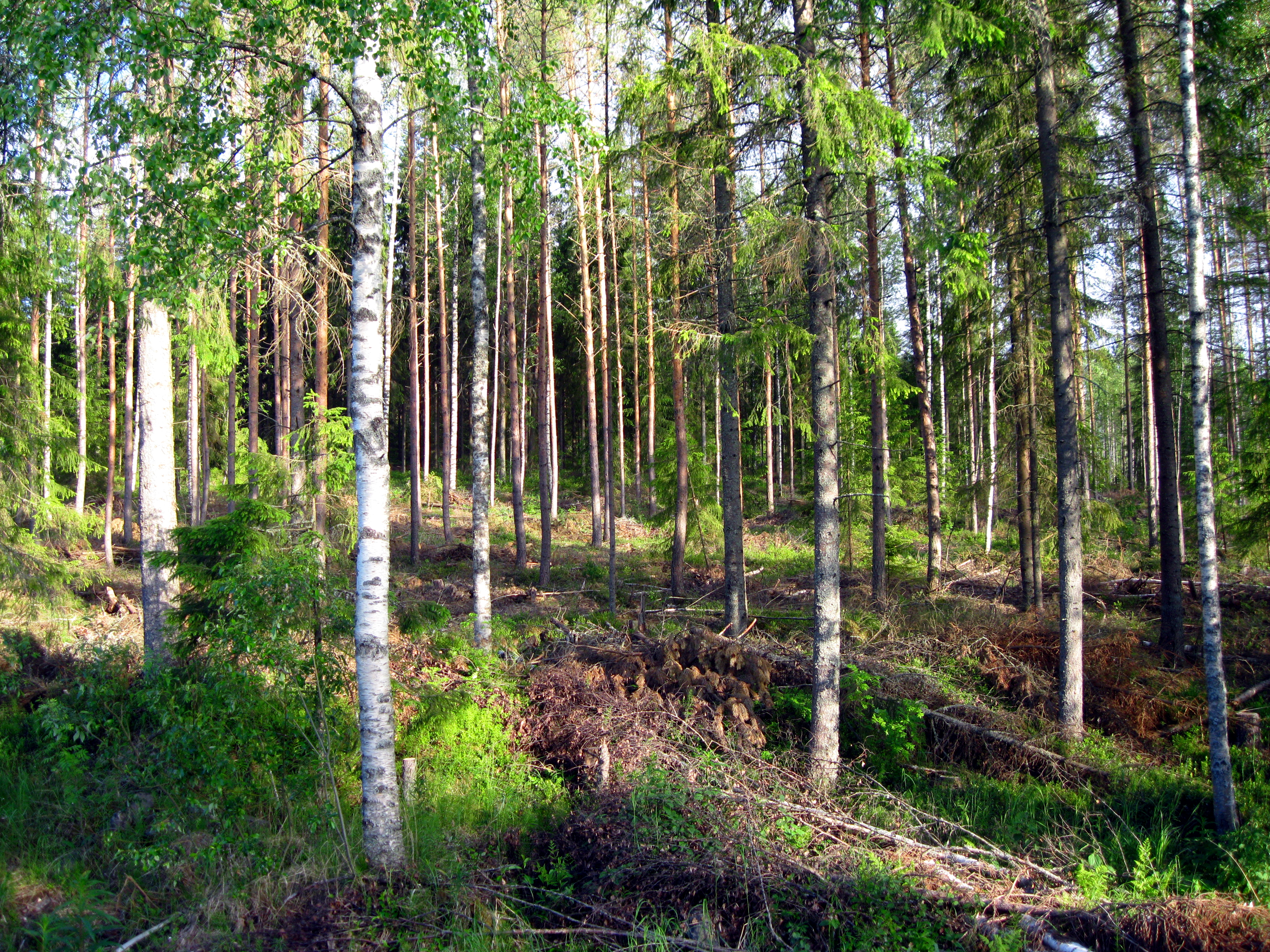
Forest thinning in Finland. Thinning is similar to and can be implemented instead of preparatory cutting.

Preparatory cutting thins the stand removing species that are not desired so that they do not contribute seeds to the establishment cut. This also allows the remaining trees to grow faster and produce more seed. If the stand does not have many undesired species the preparatory cut is not necessary. This cut is also not needed if thinning has been implemented throughout the life of the stand, treatment which has the added benefit of building resilience to windthrow.

=== Establishment cut ===
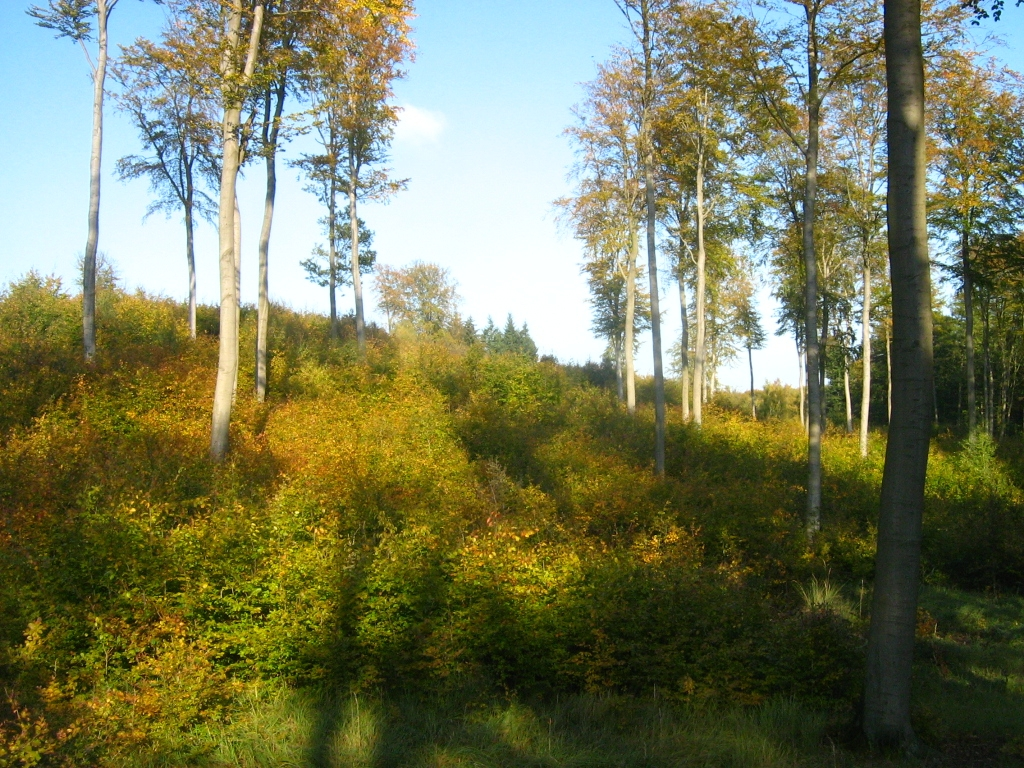
European beech regeneration following an establishment cut in a German shelterwood system.

Establishment cuttings removes enough trees to allow sufficient light into the stand for the desired regeneration while avoiding providing enough to encourage the growth of undesired vegetation. This added light also allows the remaining trees to increase their growth rates and seed production. It is done in a year when seed production is good. Only the best trees are left to seed the regeneration. In many cases the mineral soil is intentionally exposed by equipment allowing small-seeded species that require exposed soil to grow. Sometimes, the cut is followed by the use of herbicides or prescribed fire to suppress any undesired vegetation. Further, in some cases, trees are planted after the cut to increase species diversity, introduced improved stock, or create denser regrowth.

=== Removal cut ===
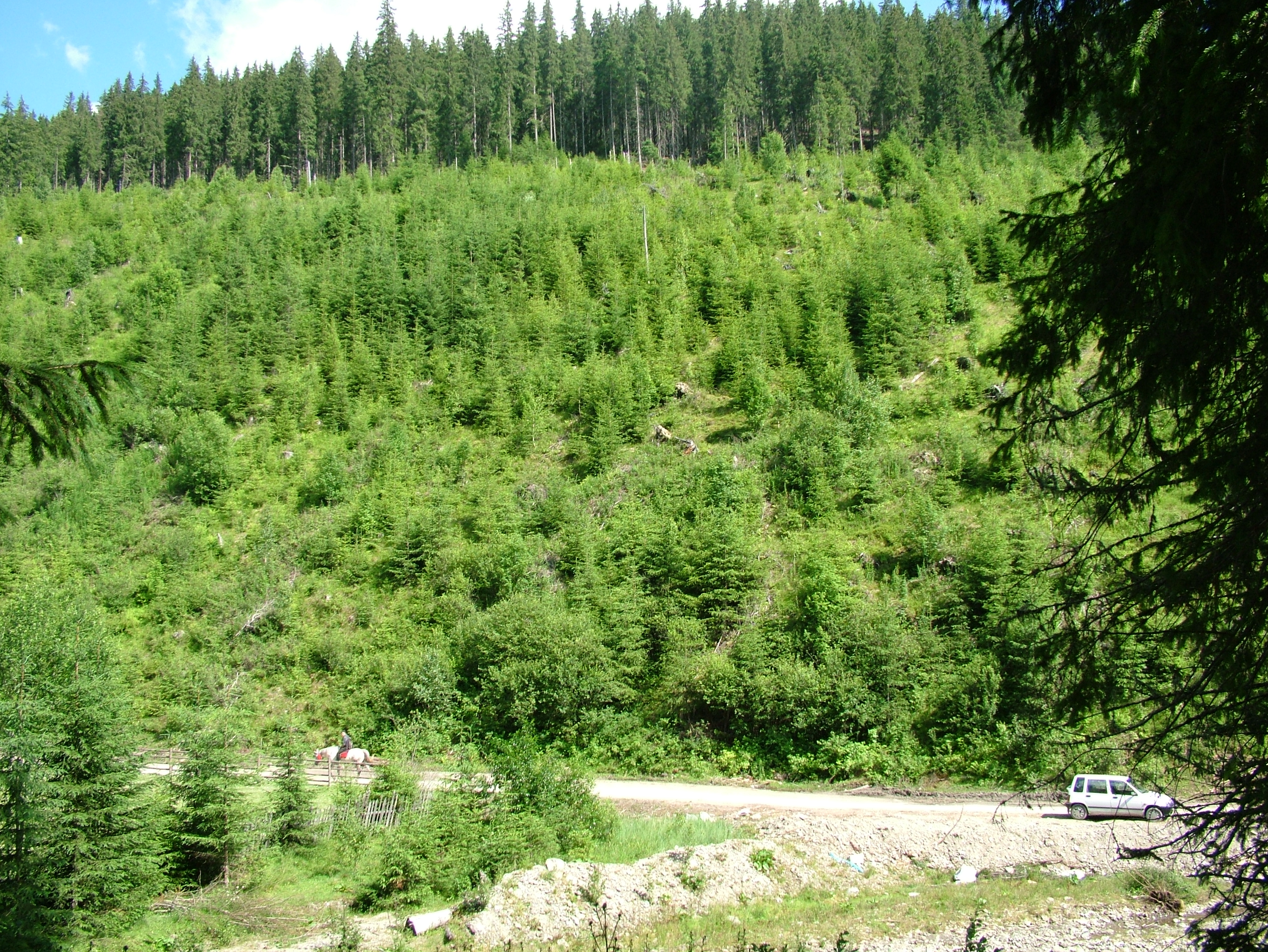
A young forest in Romania. Following a removal cut, the now even-aged stand will be composed of young trees like above.

Removal cutting removes all of the mature trees that were left to seed the regeneration. This is to give more light to the established seedlings, allowing them to grow freely. Without this cutting, seedlings will stagnate as the crowns of the older trees grow. This unintentionally damages some of the regeneration which is sometimes desirable as it helps to thin the regrowth, increasing the growth rates of remaining trees. All the mature trees may be removed, or some may be left as reserves. These will continue to grow and may be harvested several decades later, or may be left to die of old age and contribute ecological values to the site. When a very shade-tolerant species is being regenerated this is the only cut needed.

== Variations ==
=== Group shelterwood ===
Group shelterwood organizes cutting into concentric circles originating from the first cuts in the patch in the center of the circle. Eventually these concentric circles meet at which point the entire stand has been cut. Sometimes the first cut will simply release a patch of advanced regeneration that will serve as the center of the circle. Usually a third cut is not implemented in these systems since the trees on the sides of the cuts provide shade and a seed source. This has the advantage of eliminating the need to mark trees for removal as the entire overstory is removed in the second cut. It also eliminates the risk of damage to the regeneration from logging equipment.

=== Strip shelterwood ===
Strip shelterwood systems organize cuts into narrow strips. The main advantage of this variation is that it provides protection from blowdown. Cutting is conducted into the direction of the prevailing winds resulting in mature trees always being protected by younger trees from wind damage. In other situations the cuts are oriented to maximize or minimize exposure to sunlight to promote regeneration of the desired species Similarly to in group shelterwoods, when the strips are narrow enough, a total overstory removal during the second cut will often be conducted eliminating the need for a third cut.

=== Irregular shelterwood ===
Irregular shelterwood systems retain the trees left during the establishment cut for an extended period of time resulting in an uneven-aged stand with trees of multiple ages. It maybe done to get additional growth on the oldest trees to get extra-large diameters for wood. It also enhances the scenery, is important for some organisms, and creates old-growth characteristics. The irregular shelterwood system can be further divided into three variants:

- Extended irregular shelterwood involves treating the entire stand uniformly and performing the removal cut later than usual. This maintains a two-aged structure for at least 20% of the rotation length.
- Expanding gap irregular shelterwood functions similarly to group shelterwood with the difference that trees retained during the establishment cut are left in place.
- Continuous cover irregular shelterwood involves targeted group removals based on the needs of the individual species within the stand. For example, different species within the stand could be cut using different rotation lengths. This method allows for the maintenance of a more diverse forest and more continuous cover.

=== Shelterwood vs. seed-tree ===
Shelterwood is very similar to seed-tree as a regeneration method since both use natural regeneration to create an even aged stand. However, the seed-tree method retains fewer trees since it does not intentionally use tree cover to shelter the regrowth.

== Advantages and disadvantages ==
Shelterwood cutting is ideal for species that are long-lived, have seedlings that would naturally tend to start under partial shade or full shade, and have seeds that are not easily dispersible. It allows for natural regeneration from site-adapted trees that are retained because of their good genetics. Further, it has improved aesthetics compared to clearcutting since tree cover is always present on the site. There are, however, several particular problems associated with shelterwood systems. Since multiple rounds of cutting are required and since care must be taken to avoid damaging trees being retained costs can be higher than in other systems. Another issue is that trees left during the establishment and preparatory cuts become vulnerable to wind damage. In inland rainforests of British Columbia, shelterwood systems have been found to support much lower accumulations of canopy "hair" lichens (Bryoria and Alectoria) than unmanaged old growth. These lichens only reach high stand-level abundance after more than a century of undisturbed growth, so typical shelterwood rotations do not recreate the same habitat conditions. This can have ecological consequences for wildlife such as woodland caribou, which rely on heavy lichen loads during the winter.
