= Clearcutting =

Forestry/logging practice in which most or all trees in an area are uniformly cut down

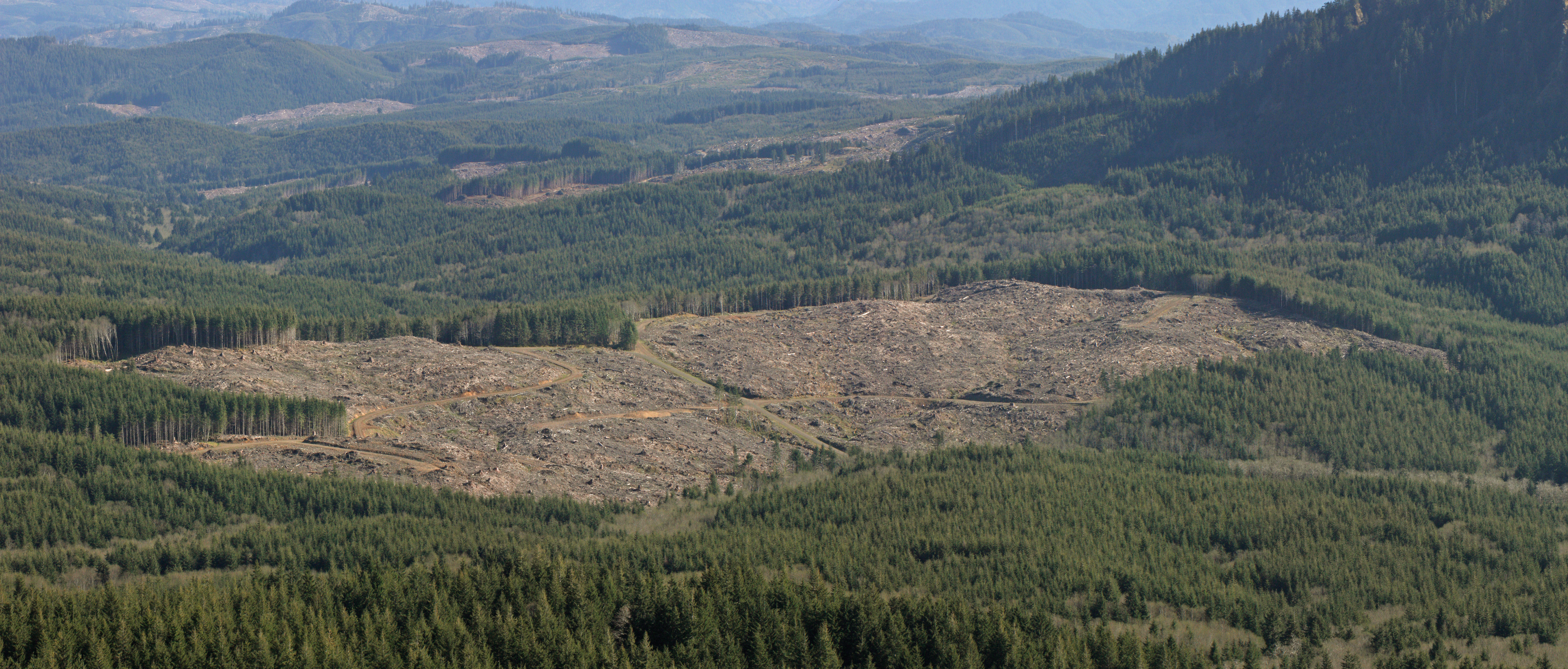
After a century of clearcutting, this forest, near the source of the Lewis and Clark River in Clatsop County, Oregon, is a patchwork. In each patch, most of the trees are the same age.

A forest before and after clearcutting

Clearcutting, clearfelling or clearcut logging is a practice in forestry and logging, in which most or all of the trees in an area are uniformly cut down. Along with shelterwood and seed tree harvests, it is used by foresters to create certain types of forest ecosystems and to promote select species that require an abundance of sunlight or grow in large, even-age stands. Clearcutting is a forestry practice that mimics the stand initiation stage of forest succession after a natural disturbance such as stand replacing fire or windthrow, and is successful for regeneration of fast growing, sun tolerant tree species and wildlife species that readily regenerate in post-stand replacing sites. Logging companies and forest-worker unions in some countries support the practice for scientific, safety and economic reasons, while detractors consider it a form of deforestation that destroys natural habitats and contributes to climate change. Environmentalists, traditional owners, local residents and others have regularly campaigned against clearcutting, including through the use of blockades and nonviolent direct action.

Clearcutting is the most economically efficient method of logging. It also may create detrimental side effects, such as the loss of topsoil, the costs of which are intensely debated by economic, environmental and other interests. In addition to the purpose of harvesting wood, clearcutting is used to create land for farming. Ultimately, the effects of clearcutting on the land will depend on how well or poorly the forest is managed, and whether it is converted to non-forest land uses after clearcuts.

While deforestation of both temperate and tropical forests through clearcutting has received considerable media attention in recent years, the other large forests of the world, such as the taiga, also known as boreal forests, are also under threat of rapid development. In Russia, North America and Scandinavia, creating protected areas and granting long-term leases to tend and regenerate trees—thus maximizing future harvests—are among the means used to limit the harmful effects of clearcutting. Long-term studies of clearcut forests, such as studies of the Pasoh Rainforest in Malaysia, are also important in providing insights into the conservation of forest resources worldwide.

== Types ==
Many variations of clearcutting exist; the most common professional practices are:

- Standard (uniform) clearcut – removal of every stem (whether commercially viable or not), so no canopy remains.
- Patch clearcut – removal of all the stems in a limited, predetermined area (patch).
- Strip clearcut – removal of all the stems in a row (strip), usually placed perpendicular to the prevailing winds in order to minimize the possibility of windthrow.
- Clearcutting-with-reserves – removal of the majority of standing stems, leaving a few reserved for other purposes (for example as snags for wildlife habitat), (often confused with the seed tree method).
- Slash-and-burn – the permanent conversion of tropical and subtropical forests for agricultural purposes. This is most prevalent in tropical and subtropical forests where population growth creates land needs from smallholders in developing and least developed countries. Slash-and-burn entails the removal of all stems in a particular area. This can be a form of deforestation, when the land is converted to other uses. However, some indigenous forest peoples, for example the 19th-century Forest Finns, rotate over the land and it does return to forest and this would be sustainable. Slash and burn techniques are typically used by civilians in search of land for living and agricultural purposes. The forest is first clear cut, and the remaining material is burned. One of the driving forces behind this process is overpopulation and subsequent sprawl. These methods also occur as a result of commercial farming. The lumber is sold for profit, and the land, cleared of all remaining brush and suitable for agricultural development, is sold to farmers.

Clearcutting contrasts with selective cutting, such as high grading, in which only commercially valuable trees are harvested, leaving all others. This practice can reduce the genetic viability of the forest over time, resulting in poorer or less vigorous offspring in the stand. Clearcutting also differs from a coppicing system, by allowing revegetation by seedlings. Additionally, destructive forms of forest management are commonly referred to as 'clearcutting'.

== Clearcutting regeneration, harvesting or system ==
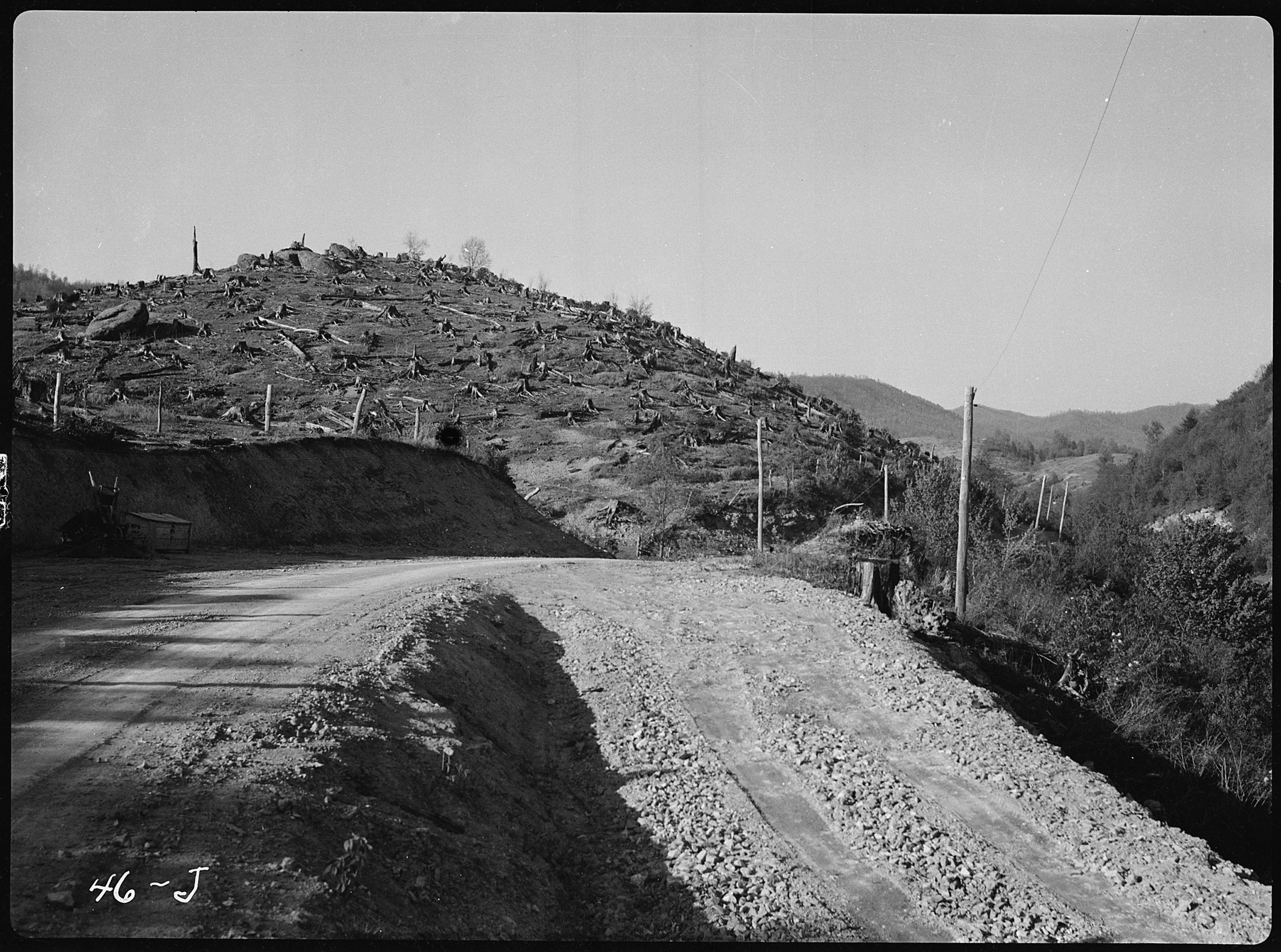
Clearcut logging in the Blue Ridge Mountains (Tennessee) in 1936

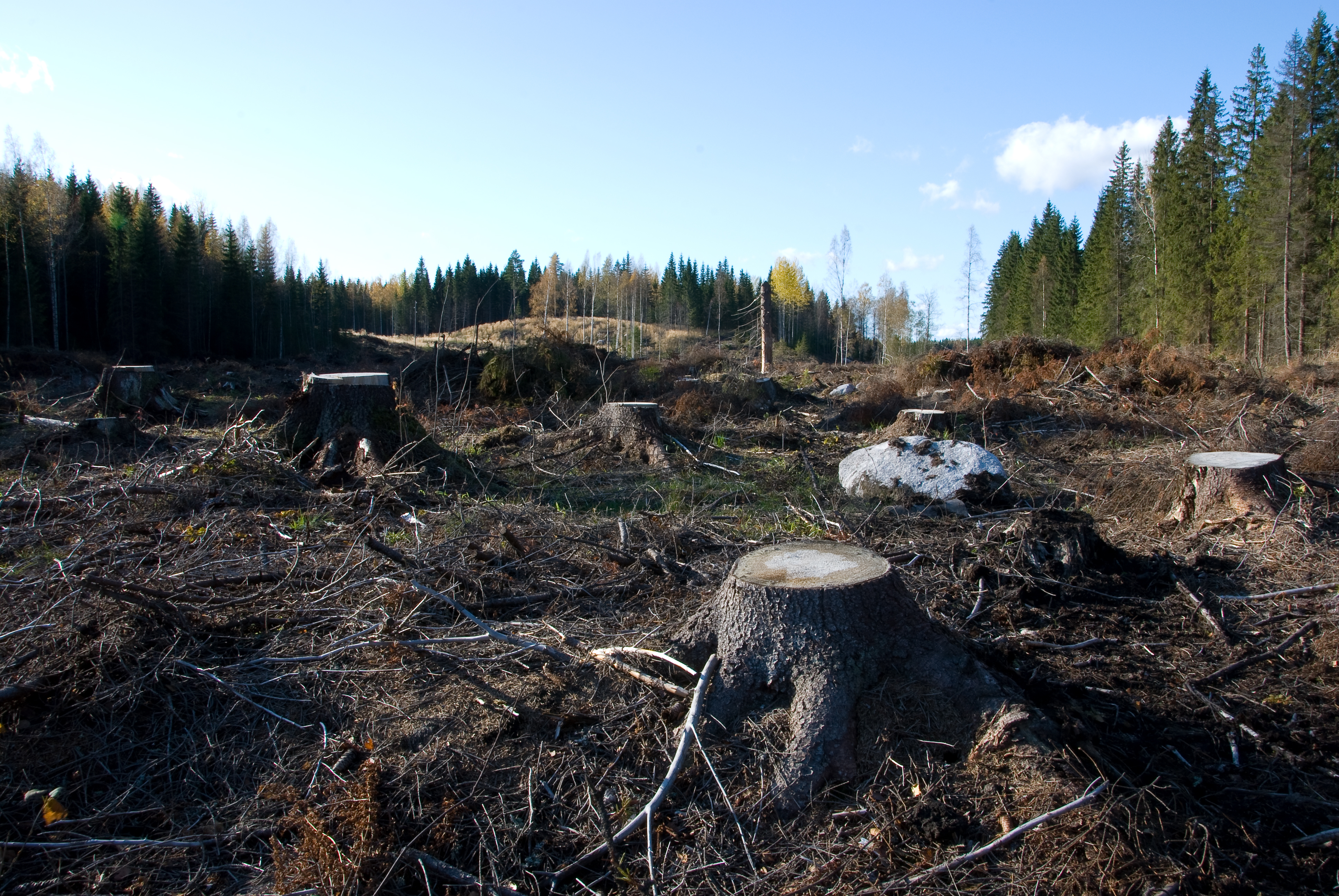
Clearcutting in Southern Finland

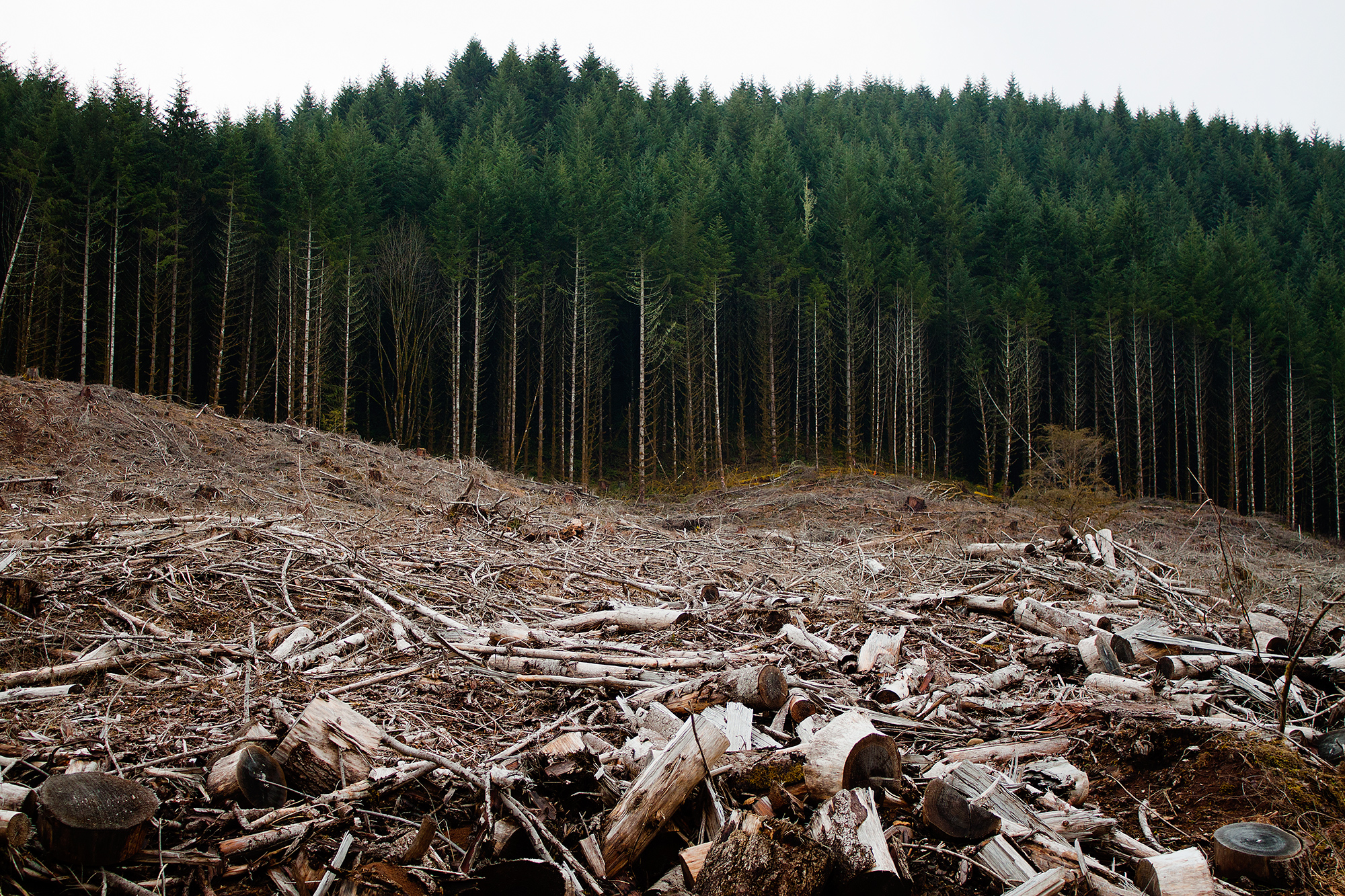
Clearcutting near Eugene, Oregon

Clearcutting can be differentiated into

- Clearcutting – clean felling by complete exploitation and removal of all the trees in one operation ... a harvesting method
- Clearcutting method – a method for regenerating an even-aged community by removing all the mature trees
- Clearcutting system – a silvicultural system incorporating the clearcutting method to remove (clear) the mature community over a considerable area at one time

Confusion between these different uses of the term is common. Furthermore, as indicated above many variations mean technically correct usage may not be descriptive enough to know what is meant on that particular occasion.

A clearcut is distinguished from selective logging where typically only a few trees per hectare are harvested in proportions dictated by management objectives. Clearcut logging is also distinct from wildland fire use, and from forest thinning. In these latter two it is common practice to leave trees that are considered undesirable, such as those that are too diseased, stunted or small to be marketable. Selective logging is usually practiced in areas with access to infrastructure.

== Effects on the environment ==
Environmental groups criticize clear-cutting as destructive to water, soil, wildlife, and atmosphere, and recommend the use of sustainable alternatives. Clear-cutting impacts the water cycle, as trees hold water and topsoil. Clear-cutting in forests removes the trees which would otherwise have been transpiring large volumes of water and also physically damages the grasses, mosses, lichens, and ferns populating the understory. Removal or damage of the biota reduces the local capacity to retain water, which can exacerbate flooding and lead to increased leaching of nutrients from the soil. The maximum nutrient loss occurs around year two and returns to pre-clearcutting levels by year four after the cut.

Removing trees surrounding stream banks prevents shading of the water body, which raises the temperature of riverbanks and rivers. Because the trees no longer hold down the soil, riverbanks increasingly erode as sediment into the water, creating excess nutrients which exacerbate the changes in the river and create problems miles away, in the sea. Clear cutting on a large scale in a watershed can cause sediment and nutrients that leach into the streams cause the acidity of the stream to increase. The nutrient content of the soil was found to return to five percent of pre-clearcutting levels after 64 years.

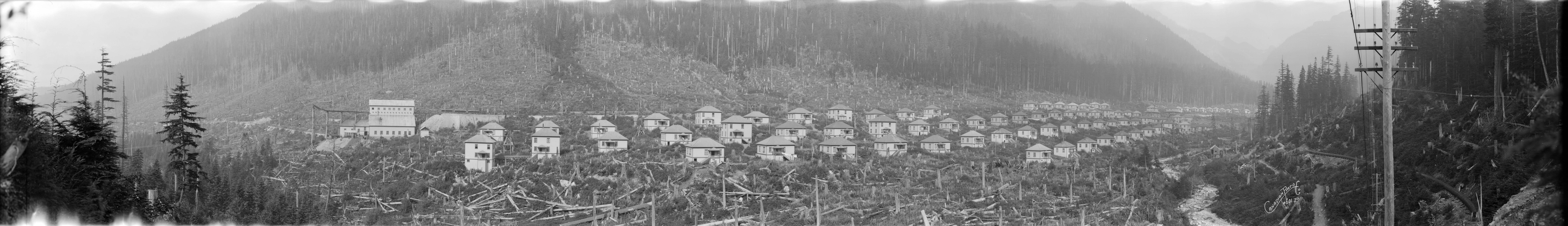
Upper town residential area of Britannia Beach in British Columbia, Canada, in September 1919. The community was built in a clearcut area adjacent to the Britannia Mines operations; stumps and stray logs are visible throughout the site and community.

=== Negative impacts ===
Clearcutting can have negative impacts, both for humans and local flora and fauna. A study from the University of Oregon found that in certain zones, areas that were clear cut had nearly three times the amount of erosion due to slides. When the roads required by the clearcutting were factored in, the increase in slide activity appeared to be about 5 times greater compared to nearby forested areas. The roads built for clearcutting interrupt normal surface drainage because the roads are not as permeable as the normal ground cover. The roads also change subsurface water movement due to the redistribution of soil and rock. Clearcutting may lead to increased stream flow during storms, loss of habitat and species diversity, opportunities for invasive and weedy species, and negative impacts on scenery, specifically, a growth of contempt by those familiar with the area for the wooded, planet aftermaths, as well as a decrease in property values; diminished recreation, hunting, and fishing opportunities. Clearcutting decreases the occurrence of natural disturbances like forest fires and natural uprooting. Over time, this can deplete the local seed bank.

In temperate and boreal climates, clearcutting can have an effect on the depth of snow, which is usually greater in a clearcut area than in the forest, due to a lack of interception and evapotranspiration. This results in less soil frost, which in combination with higher levels of direct sunlight results in snowmelt occurring earlier in the spring and earlier peak runoff.

The world's rain forests could completely vanish in a hundred years at the current rate of deforestation. Between June 2000 and June 2008, more than 150,000 km^{2} (58,000 sq mi) of rainforest were cleared in the Brazilian Amazon. Huge areas of forest have already been lost. For example, only eight to fourteen percent of the Atlantic Forest in South America now remains. While deforestation rates have slowed since 2004, forest loss is expected to continue for the foreseeable future. Farmers slash and burn large parcels of forest every year to create grazing and croplands, but the forest's nutrient-poor soil often renders the land ill-suited for agriculture, and within a year or two, the farmers move on.

=== Positive perspectives ===
Clearcutting can be practiced to encourage the growth and proliferation of tree species that require high light intensity. Generally, a harvest area wider than double the height of the adjacent trees will no longer be subject to the moderating influence of the woodland on the microclimate. The width of the harvest area can thus determine which species will come to dominate. Those with high tolerance to extremes in temperature, soil moisture, and resistance to browsing may be established, in particular secondary successional pioneer species.

Clearcutting can be used by foresters as a method of mimicking a natural disturbance and increasing primary successional species, such as poplar (aspen), willow and black cherry in North America. Clearcutting has also proved to be effective in creating animal habitat and browsing areas, which otherwise would not exist without natural stand-replacing disturbances such as wildfires, large scale windthrow, or avalanches.

Clearcuts are used to help regenerate species that cannot compete in mature forests. A number of them are aspen, jack pine, and, in areas with poor soils, oaks—important species for both game and nongame wildlife species. Clearcutting can also lead to increased vascular-plant diversity in the area. This is most pronounced after a couple years of clearcutting and in herb-rich forests where scarification took place.

No significant changes in water temperature were observed when patch clearcutting was done 100 ft (30 m) away from a river. This suggests that patch clearcutting is a possible solution to concerns about changes in water temperature due to clearcutting. The effects of clearcutting on soil nutrient content were not examined in this study.

More recently, forest managers have found that clearcutting oak stands helps regenerate oak forests in areas of poor soil. The tree canopies in oak forests often shade out the ground, making it impossible for newly sprouted oaks to grow. When the mature trees are removed, the saplings stand a chance of recruiting into the forest.

=== Effects on wildlife ===
Clearcutting's main destruction is towards habitats, where it makes the habitats more vulnerable in the future to damage by insects, diseases, acid rain, and wind. Removal of all trees from an area destroys the physical habitats of many species in wildlife. Also, clearcutting can contribute to problems for ecosystems that depend on forests, like the streams and rivers that run through them.

In Canada, the black-tailed deer population is at further risk after clearcutting. The deer are a food source for wolves and cougars, as well as First Nations and other hunters. While deer may not be at risk in cities and rural countryside, where they can be seen running through neighbourhoods and feeding on farms, in higher altitude areas they require forest shelter.

=== In Maine ===
In Maine, a form of land management known as Outcome Based Forestry (OBF) allows for a wide range of harvesting as long as the removed trees do not exceed the amount of tree growth. Since implemented, this program has led to large-scale clearcutting and monoculture tree planting, and research by the University of Maine's Sustainability Solutions Initiative has found that 8,000,000 acres (3,200,000 ha) of certified forest land in (primarily northern) Maine is being overharvested, leading to reduced long-term stability of timber harvests and increased erosion and pollution in the watershed. These practices have sparked environmental justice concerns regarding the health and well-being of foresters and locals.

== See also ==
- Amazon rainforest
- Clearcutting in British Columbia
- Even-aged timber management
- Land clearing in Australia
- List of tree species by shade tolerance – shade intolerant and some intermediate species are primarily regenerated with clearcuts
- Seed production and gene diversity
