= Seed tree =

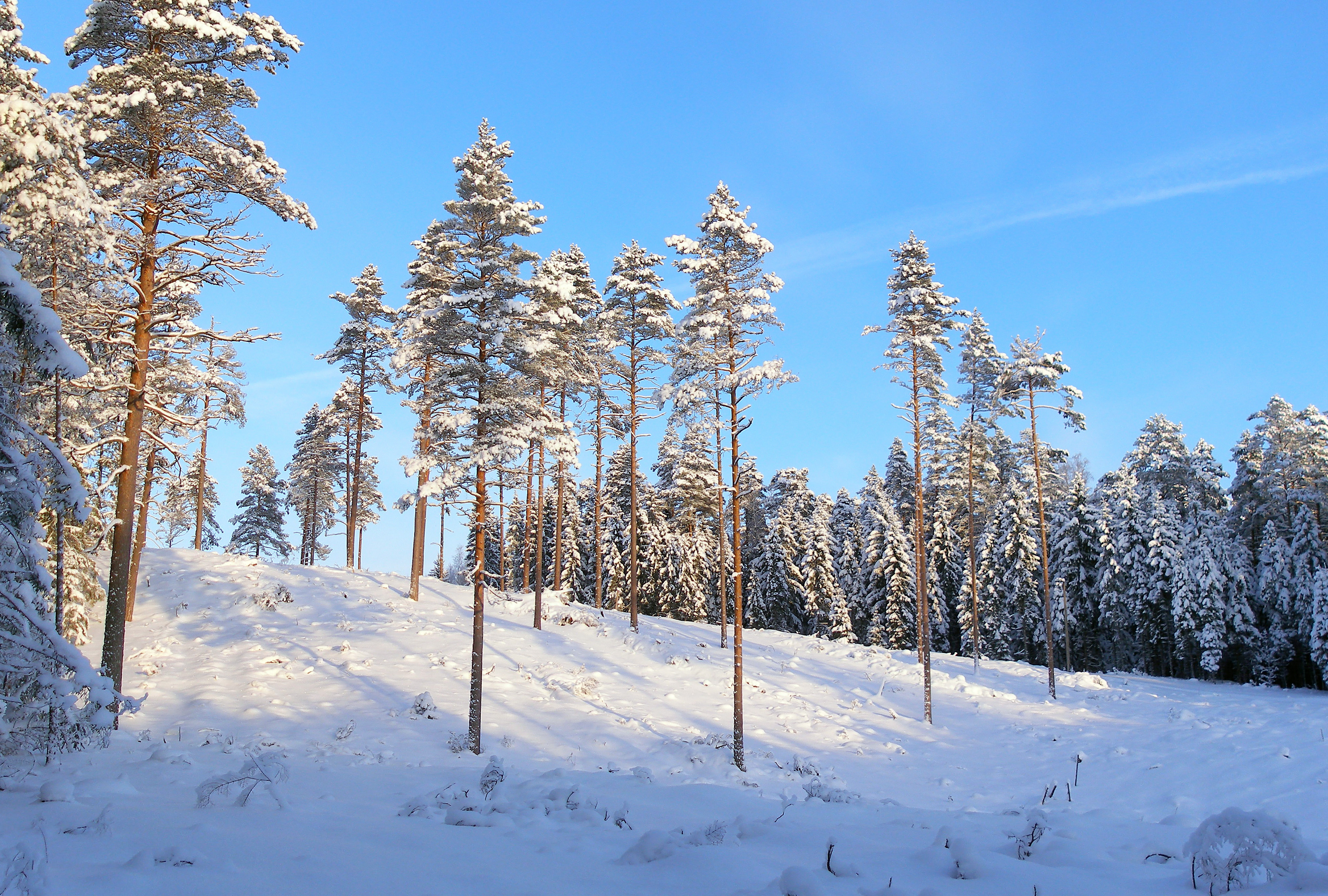
Seed trees (Scots Pine) on a recently logged stand in Northern Estonia

Seed trees are trees left after reproduction cutting to provide seeds for natural regeneration in the seed-tree method. These trees serve as both the gene source for the new crop of regeneration and as a source of timber during future cuttings. Because of its importance, a seed tree should be carefully chosen based upon both economic and biological factors. Selected seed trees should be the desired species, phenotypically superior, prolific in seeding and flowering, sturdy and healthy, free of damage, and of good growth form.

After the site has been successfully regenerated, seed trees may be commercially harvested or the trees may be retained for visual enhancement and as backup against catastrophic losses of regeneration due to agents such as fire or drought. The presence of seed trees distinguishes the seed-tree method from clearcutting. Many people consider the seed-tree method more aesthetically pleasing than clearcutting because some mature trees are retained on the site for at least until regeneration becomes well established.

The seed-tree method is usually applied to plants with a wind-blown seed (Scots pine), rather not to those with hard seeds, such as oak and beech which do not travel far from the originating tree.

== See also ==
- Mast (botany)
- Shelterwood cutting
