= Live crown =

The live crown is the top part of a tree, the part that has green leaves (as opposed to the bare trunk, bare branches, and dead leaves). The ratio of the size of a tree's live crown to its total height is used in estimating its health and its level of competition with neighboring trees. This is referred to as the Live Crown Ratio (LCR).
