= Even-aged timber management =

Group of forest management practices

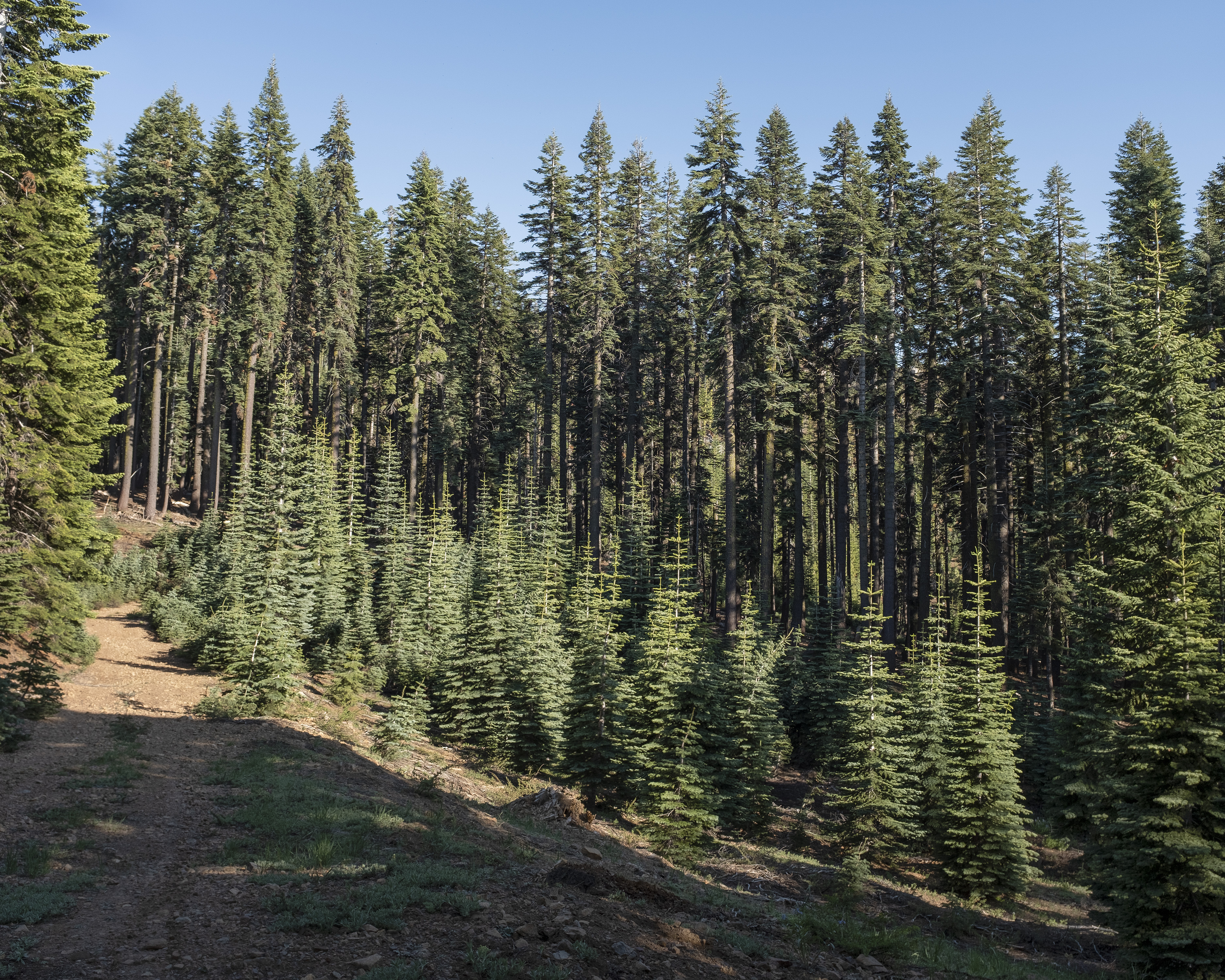
A young stand of even-aged fir trees growing in a formerly clearcut area in the Sierra Nevada mountains, with an older cohort behind them.

Even-aged timber management is a group of forest management practices employed to achieve a nearly coeval cohort group of forest trees. The practice of even-aged management is often pursued to minimize costs to loggers. In some cases, the practices of even aged timber management are frequently implicated in biodiversity loss and other ecological damage. Even-aged timber management can also be beneficial to restoring natural native species succession.

== Process ==
The first step in even aged timber management is to select a suitable stand for harvest. Trees must be of merchantable size, a desirable species, and in an area accessible to harvesting equipment. Once selected, the stand is harvested (usually using feller-bunchers, skidders, and processors). Merchantable trees (trees with boles large enough to be sold to a mill) are harvested and processed whereas unmerchantable trees (trees that are too small or of an undesirable species) are either crushed by machinery or cut to make equipment movement easier. This process is called clearcutting, and the result is a cutblock. At this stage, the forestry company is required to replant the same proportion of species that were there previous to harvest. Usually, silviculture techniques are employed to ensure that species survive and grow in the proper proportion. Shade-intolerant species such as trembling aspen (Populus tremuloides) and marsh reedgrass (Calamagrostis canadensis) will thrive in the open conditions of a clearcut, outcompeting shade-tolerant species such as white spruce (Picea glauca). Mechanical site preparation and herbicide treatments are often applied initially to allow for adequate shade-tolerant growth. This way, the shade-tolerants are given a head start and the shade-intolerants will catch up over time once silviculture treatments are stopped, resulting in an even-aged stand of trees with little vertical stratification.

== Economic implications ==
Even-aged forest management is the harvesting system of choice in many parts of the world because it is often considered to be the only method that is economically viable. Forestry operations have extremely high variable costs- per hour expenses for harvesting equipment and per kilometer expenses for log transportation compose a very large portion of the total cost to harvest a stand. Therefore, companies must obtain as much productivity as possible from their hourly equipment in order to be profitable. Uneven-aged management techniques where only certain trees are harvested, such as shelterwood systems, incur the same hourly costs while harvesting fewer trees per hour. This reality explains why in Canada, for example, 90% of forests harvested are done so by clear cut through an even-aged management system.

== Wildlife considerations ==
Ecological analysis indicates that even aged timber management can produce inferior outcomes for wildlife biodiversity and abundance. Some species thrive on uneven or natural forest tree distribution. For example, the wild turkey thrives when uneven heights and canopy variations exist and its numbers are diminished by even aged timber management.

Depending on the ecosystem, however, some species thrive under even aged timber management. Clear cutting closely mimics the results of the most prominent natural disturbance in the boreal forest- wildfires. Certain tree species of this forest type have evolved over time to regenerate favourably in open, well-lit conditions, while others are adapted to thrive in the shade they produce. Clear cutting allows shade intolerant species, such as aspen and jack pine, to regenerate where they could not in a mature forest.

Clear cutting areas for even-aged timber management can also benefit many wildlife species. The abundance of coarse woody debris added to the forest floor is beneficial to salamander and snake species, while the release of understory shrubs provides an increase of berry-foraging opportunities for bear and songbirds. In general, the immature, grassy forest regenerated after a clear cut fulfills specific habitat requirements for many species that cannot be found in mature forests. In the boreal forest, for example, wildfire has been suppressed by humans, resulting in many overmature stands. Even aged timber management restores the successional cycle and allows early successional species to recolonize immature habitat.

== See also ==
- Clearcutting
- Slash and burn
- Stand level modelling
