= Shade tolerance =

Plant's ability to tolerate low light levels

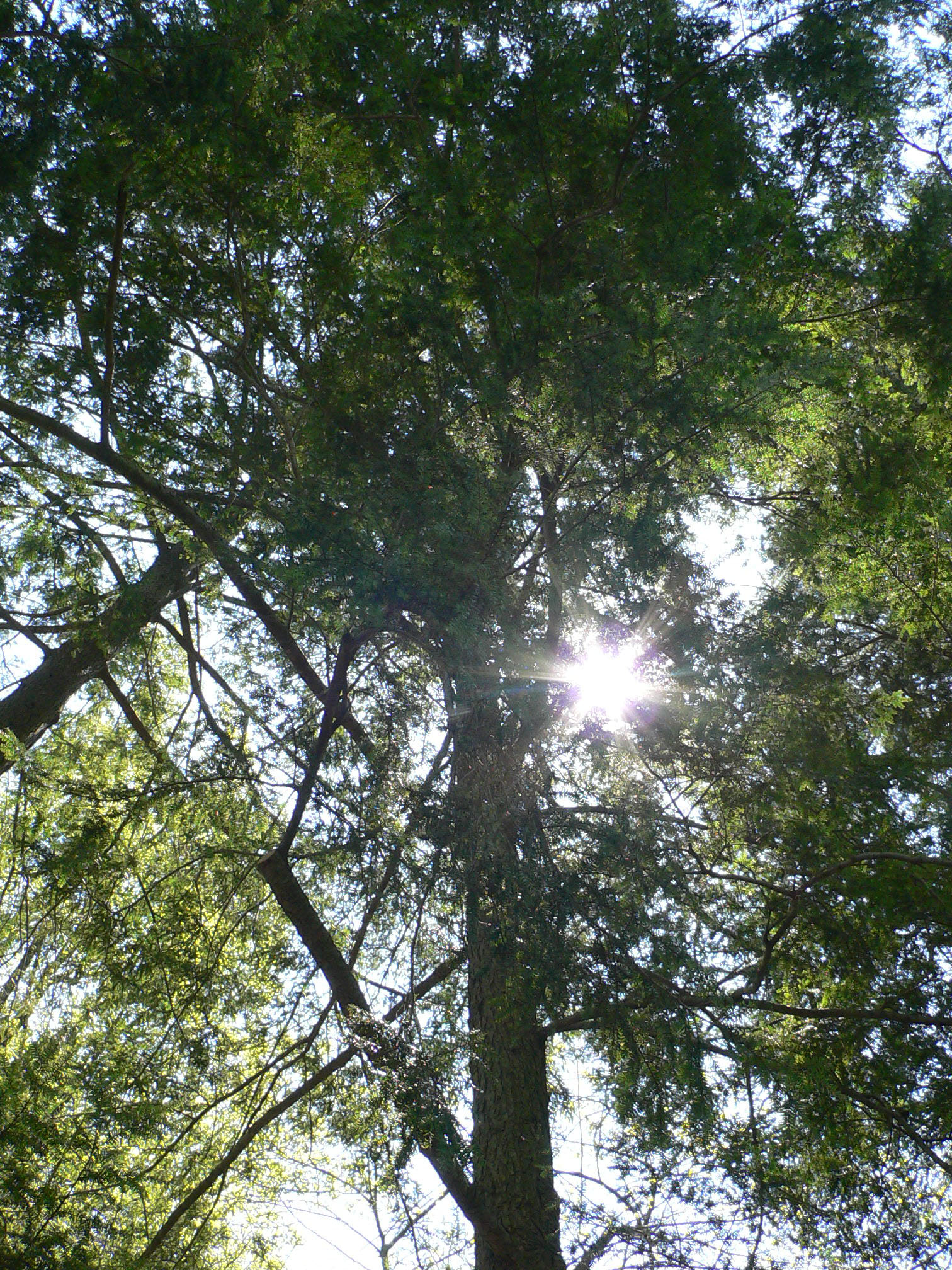
Eastern Hemlock is a shade-tolerant tree.

In ecology, shade tolerance is a plant's ability to tolerate low light levels. The term is also used in horticulture and landscaping, although in this context its use is sometimes imprecise, especially in labeling of plants for sale in commercial nurseries.

Shade tolerance is a complex, multi-faceted property of plants. Different plant species exhibit different adaptations to shade, and a particular plant can exhibit varying degrees of shade tolerance, or even of requirement for light, depending on its history or stage of development.

== Basic concepts ==
Except for some parasitic plants, all land plants need sunlight to survive. However, in general, more sunlight does not always make it easier for plants to survive. In direct sunlight, plants face desiccation and exposure to UV rays, and must expend energy producing pigments to block UV light, and waxy coatings to prevent water loss.

Plants adapted to shade have the ability to use far-red light (about 730 nm) more effectively than plants adapted to full sunlight. Most red light gets absorbed by the shade-intolerant canopy plants, but more of the far-red light penetrates the canopy, reaching the understorey. The shade-tolerant plants found here are capable of photosynthesis using light at such wavelengths.

The situation with respect to nutrients is often different in shade and sun. Most shade is due to the presence of a canopy of other plants, and this is usually associated with a completely different environment—richer in soil nutrients—than sunny areas.

Shade-tolerant plants are thus adapted to be efficient energy-users. In simple terms, shade-tolerant plants grow broader, thinner leaves to catch more sunlight relative to the cost of producing the leaf. Shade-tolerant plants are also usually adapted to make more use of soil nutrients than shade-intolerant plants.

A distinction may be made between "shade-tolerant" plants and "shade-loving" or sciophilous plants. Sciophilous plants are dependent on a degree of shading that would eventually kill most other plants, or significantly stunt their growth.

== Plants adaptation to the changing light ==
Plants applied multilevel adaptations to the changing light environment from the systemic level to the molecular level.

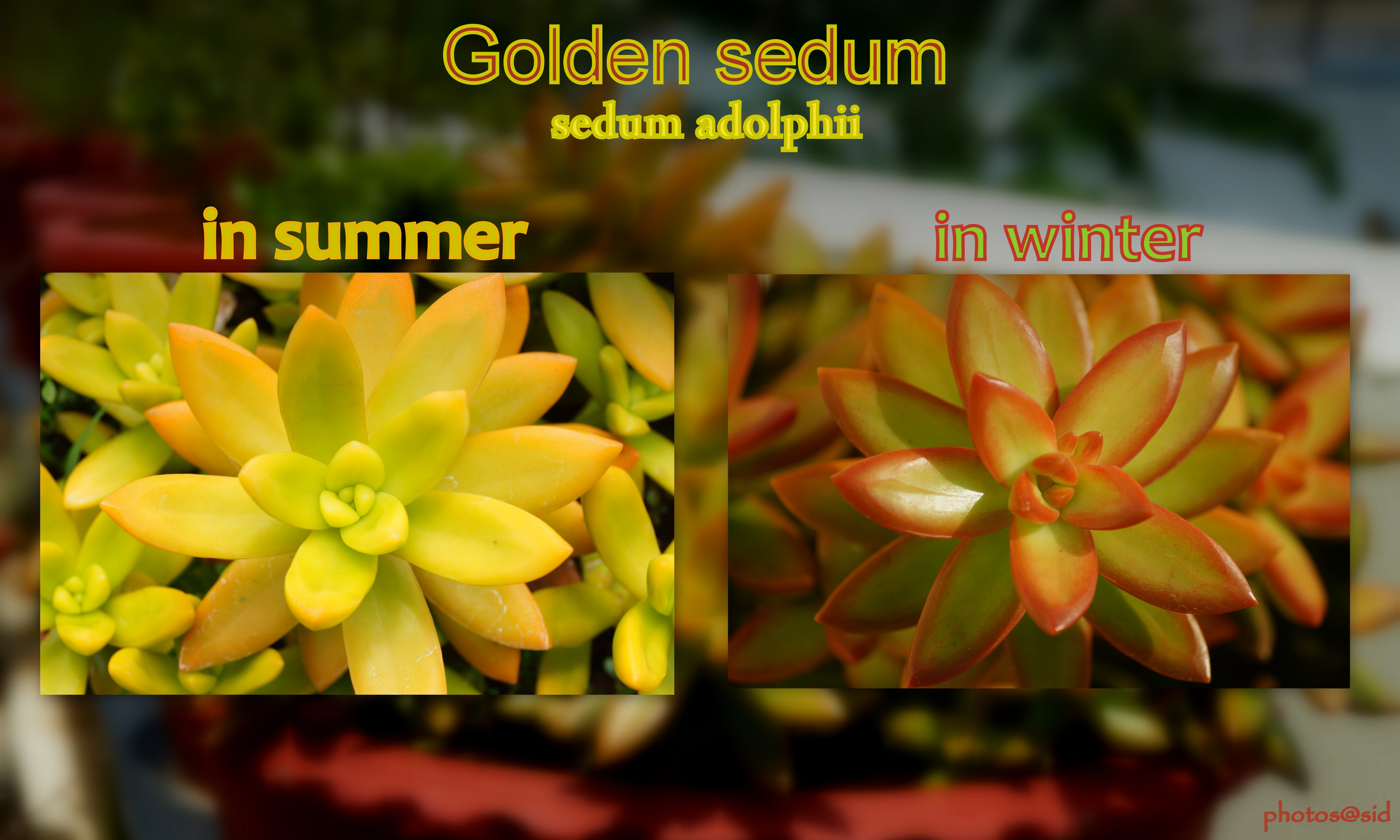
Seasonal colour changes in Sedum adolphii – a response to change in amount of daylight

=== Leaf movement ===
Various types of leaf movement for adaptation to changing light environment have been identified: developmental, passive and active.

- Active movements are reversible. Some plants use blue-light absorbing pigments as a sensor and pulvinar motor tissue to drive leaf movement. These adaptions are usually slow but relatively efficient. They are advantageous to some shade plants that have low photosynthetic capacity but are occasionally exposed to small light bursts.
- Passive movements are related to drought, where plants employ passive adaptation like increasing leaf reflectance during high light (by for example producing salt crystals on the leaf surface) or developing air-filled hairs.
- Developmental movements are slow and irreversible.

=== Chloroplast movement ===
Chloroplast movement is one of the plant adaptations to the changing light at the molecular level. A study suggested that chloroplast movement shared the same photoreceptor with leaf movement as they showed similar action spectra. It is fast adaptation, occurring within minutes but limited as it can only reduced 10–20% of the light absorption during high light. Limitations of chloroplast movement could be the presence of other large organelles like vacuole that restrict the chloroplast passage to the desired side of a cell. On top of that, chloroplast movement might not be efficient as natural light tends to scatter in all directions.

=== Photosystem modulation ===
Photosystem modulation is an example of a long term light adaptation or acclimation that usually occurs on the genetic level; transcriptional, translational and post-translational. Plants grown under high light intensity usually have smaller antenna compared to plants grown under low light. A study found that the acclimative modulation of PSII antenna size only involves the outer light harvesting complexes of PSII (LHC-PSII) caused by the proteolysis of its apoprotein.

The response towards higher light took up to two days upon enzyme expression and activation. Reduction of outer LHC-II by half through proteolysis took less than a day once activated. By changing the PS numbers, plant are able to adapt to the changing light of the environment. To compensate for the reduction of the red light usually encountered by the plant grown under canopy, they possessed higher PS-II to PS-I ratio compared to the plant grown under the higher light. However the factors involved in the mechanism are not well understood. Study suggested the protein phosphorylation including LHC-II is an important pathway for signal transduction in light acclimatization.

== Herbaceous plants ==
In temperate zones, many wildflowers and non-woody plants persist in the closed canopy of a forest by leafing out early in the spring, before the trees leaf out. This is partly possible because the ground tends to be more sheltered and thus the plants are less susceptible to frost, during the period of time when it would still be hazardous for trees to leaf out. As an extreme example of this, winter annuals sprout in the fall, grow through the winter, and flower and die in the spring.

Just like with trees, shade tolerance in herbaceous plants is diverse. Some early-leafing out plants will persist after the canopy leafs out, whereas others rapidly die back. In many species, whether or not this happens depends on the environment, such as water supply and sunlight levels. Hydrangea hirta is a shade-tolerant deciduous shrub found in Japan.

Although most plants grow towards light, many tropical vines, such as Monstera deliciosa and a number of other members of the family Araceae, such as members of the genus Philodendron, initially grow away from light; this is a dramatic example of sciophilous growth, which helps them locate a tree trunk, which they then climb to regions of brighter light. The upper shoots and leaves of such a Philodendron grow as typical light-loving, photophilic plants once they break out into full sunshine.

== Trees ==
In forests where rainfall is plentiful and water is not the limiting factor to growth, shade tolerance is one of the most important factors characterizing tree species. However, different species of trees exhibit different adaptations to shade.

The eastern hemlock, considered the most shade-tolerant of all North American tree species, is able to germinate, persist, and even grow under a completely closed canopy. Hemlocks also exhibit the ability to transfer energy to nearby trees through their root system. In contrast, the Sugar Maple, also considered to be highly shade-tolerant, will germinate under a closed canopy and persist as an understory species, but only grows to full size when a gap is generated.

Shade-intolerant species such as willow and aspen cannot sprout under a closed canopy. Shade-intolerant species often grow in wetlands, along waterways, or in disturbed areas, where there is adequate access to direct sunlight.

In addition to being able to compete in conditions of low light intensity, shade-bearing species, especially trees, are able to withstand relatively low daytime temperatures compared with the open, and above all high root competition especially with subordinate vegetation. It is very difficult to separate the relative importance of light and below ground competition, and in practical terms they are inextricably linked.

== See also ==
- Daily light integral
- List of tree species by shade tolerance
- PI curve
