= List of tree species by shade tolerance =

A list of tree species, grouped generally by biogeographic realm and specifically by bioregions, and shade tolerance. Shade-tolerant species are species that are able to thrive in the shade, and in the presence of natural competition by other plants. Shade-intolerant species require full sunlight and little or no competition. Intermediate shade-tolerant trees fall somewhere in between the two.

== Americas ==
=== Nearctic realm ===
==== Eastern North America ====
Shade tolerant

- Abies balsamea, Balsam Fir
- Acer negundo, Boxelder
- Acer saccharum, Sugar Maple
- Aesculus spp., Buckeyes
- Carpinus caroliniana, American Hornbeam
- Carya laciniosa, Shellbark Hickory
- Chamaecyparis thyoides, Atlantic White Cypress or Atlantic White Cedar
- Cornus florida, Flowering Dogwood
- Hamamelis virginiana, Witch-hazel
- Diospyros spp., Persimmon
- Fagus grandifolia, American Beech
- Ilex opaca, American Holly
- Magnolia grandiflora, southern magnolia
- Morus rubra, Red Mulberry
- Nyssa spp., Tupelos
- Ostrya virginiana, Eastern Hophornbeam
- Oxydendrum arboreum, Sourwood
- Picea glauca, White Spruce
- Picea mariana, Black Spruce
- Picea rubens, Red Spruce
- Tilia americana, Basswood
- Thuja occidentalis, Northern White Cedar
- Tsuga canadensis, Eastern Hemlock
- Ulmus rubra, Slippery Elm

Intermediate shade tolerant

- Acer rubrum, Red Maple
- Acer saccharinum, Silver Maple
- Betula alleghaniensis, Yellow Birch
- Betula lenta, Sweet Birch
- Carya spp., Hickories (except for Shellbark and Bitternut)
- Castanea dentata, American Chestnut
- Celtis occidentalis, Hackberry
- Fraxinus americana, White Ash
- Fraxinus pennsylvanica, Green Ash
- Fraxinus nigra, Black Ash
- Magnolia spp., Magnolias
- Quercus alba, White Oak
- Quercus macrocarpa, Bur Oak
- Quercus nigra, Water Oak
- Quercus rubra, Northern Red Oak
- Quercus velutina, Black Oak
- Pinus elliottii, Slash Pine
- Pinus strobus, Eastern White Pine
- Taxodium distichum, Bald Cypress
- Ulmus americana, American elm
- Ulmus thomasii, Rock Elm

Shade intolerant

- Betula papyrifera, Paper Birch
- Betula populifolia, Gray Birch
- Carya cordiformis, Bitternut hickory
- Catalpa spp., Catalpas
- Carya illinoinensis, Pecan
- Gymnocladus dioicus, Kentucky Coffee Tree
- Juglans cinerea, Butternut
- Juglans nigra, Black Walnut
- Juniperus virginiana, Eastern Red Cedar
- Larix laricina, Tamarack
- Liriodendron tulipifera, Yellow-poplar
- Maclura pomifera, Osage Orange
- Pinus banksiana, Jack Pine
- Pinus echinata, Shortleaf Pine
- Pinus palustris, Longleaf Pine
- Pinus resinosa, Red Pine
- Pinus rigida, Pitch Pine
- Pinus taeda, Loblolly pine
- Pinus virginiana, Virginia Pine
- Platanus occidentalis, Sycamore
- Populus deltoides, Eastern Cottonwood
- Populus grandidentata, Big-Tooth Aspen
- Populus tremuloides, Quaking Aspen
- Prunus pensylvanica, Pin Cherry
- Prunus serotina, Black Cherry
- Quercus stellata, Post Oak
- Robinia pseudoacacia, Black Locust
- Ulmus alata, Winged elm
- Salix spp., Willows
- Sassafras spp., Sassafras

==== Western North America ====
Shade tolerant

- Abies amabilis, Pacific Silver Fir
- Abies concolor, white fir
- Abies grandis, Grand Fir
- Abies lasiocarpa, Alpine Fir
- Acer circinatum, Vine Maple
- Acer macrophyllum, Big-leaf Maple
- Arbutus arizonica, Arizona Madrone
- Arbutus menziesii, Pacific Madrone
- Arbutus xalapensis, Texas Madrone
- Cupressus nootkatensis, Nootka Cypress
- Calocedrus decurrens, California Incense-cedar
- Notholithocarpus densiflorus, Tan Oak
- Picea engelmannii, Engelmann Spruce
- Picea sitchensis, Sitka Spruce
- Quercus chrysolepis, Canyon Live Oak
- Sebastiania pavoniana, Mexican jumping bean
- Sequoia sempervirens, Coast Redwood
- Sequoiadendron giganteum, Giant Sequoia
- Taxus brevifolia, Pacific Yew
- Thuja plicata Western Red Cedar
- Torreya californica, California Torreya
- Tsuga heterophylla, Western Hemlock
- Tsuga mertensiana, Mountain Hemlock
- Umbellularia californica, California Laurel

Intermediate shade tolerant

- Abies magnifica, Red Fir
- Alnus rubra, Red Alder
- Cercis canadensis, Texas Redbud
- Chrysolepis spp., Golden Chinquapin
- Fraxinus latifolia, Oregon Ash
- Juniperus ashei, Ashe Juniper
- Picea pungens, Colorado blue spruce
- Prunus mexicana, Mexican Plum
- Pinus lambertiana, Sugar Pine
- Pinus monticola Western White Pine
- Pinus radiata, Monterey pine
- Pseudotsuga spp., Douglas-fir
- Quercus garryana, Oregon White Oak
- Quercus lobata, valley oak

Shade intolerant

- Abies procera, Noble Fir
- Juniperus californica, California Juniper
- Juniperus deppeana, Alligator Juniper
- Juniperus monosperma, One-seed Juniper
- Juniperus occidentalis, Western Juniper
- Juniperus osteosperma, Utah Juniper
- Juniperus scopulorum, Rocky Mountain Juniper
- Larix lyallii, Alpine Larch
- Larix occidentalis, Western Larch
- Pinus albicaulis, Whitebark Pine
- Pinus aristata, Rocky Mountains Bristlecone Pine
- Pinus attenuata, Knobcone Pine
- Pinus balfouriana, Foxtail Pine
- Pinus contorta, Lodgepole Pine
- Pinus coulteri, Coulter Pine
- Pinus flexilis, Limber Pine
- Pinus jeffreyi, Jeffrey Pine
- Pinus longaeva, Great Basin Bristlecone Pine
- Pinus muricata, Bishop Pine
- Pinus ponderosa, Ponderosa Pine
- Pinus sabineana, Gray Pine
- Pinus Ducampopinus spp., Piñon Pines
- Populus fremontii, Fremont Cottonwood
- Populus tremuloides, Quaking aspen

== Eurasia ==
=== Palearctic realm ===
==== Central Europe ====
Shade tolerant

- Abies alba, European Silver Fir, especially shade tolerant
- Acer platanoides, Norway Maple
- Acer pseudoplatanus, Sycamore Maple
- Carpinus betulus, European Hornbeam
- Fagus sylvatica, European beech, especially shade tolerant
- Ilex aquifolium, European Holly
- Ostrya carpinifolia, European Hop-Hornbeam
- Prunus avium, Wild Cherry
- Sorbus domestica, True Service Tree
- Sorbus torminalis, Wild Service Tree
- Taxus baccata, European Yew, especially shade tolerant
- Ulmus glabra, Wych Elm
- Ulmus laevis, European White Elm

Intermediate shade tolerant

- Acer campestre, Field Maple
- Acer monspessulanum, Montpellier Maple
- Acer opalus, Italian Maple
- Alnus glutinosa, Black Alder
- Alnus incana, Grey Alder
- Castanea sativa, Sweet Chestnut
- Fraxinus excelsior, European Ash
- Fraxinus ornus, Manna Ash
- Juglans regia, Common Walnut
- Mespilus germanica, Common Medlar
- Picea abies, Norway Spruce
- Pinus cembra, Swiss Pine
- Prunus padus, Bird Cherry
- Pyrus pyraster, European Wild Pear
- Quercus cerris, Turkey Oak
- Quercus petraea, Sessile Oak
- Sorbus aria, Whitebeam
- Sorbus aucuparia, European Rowan
- Sorbus intermedia, Swedish Whitebeam
- Tilia cordata, Small-leafed Linden
- Tilia platyphyllos, Large-leafed Linden
- Ulmus minor, field elm

Shade intolerant

- Betula pendula, Silver Birch, especially high light requirement
- Betula pubescens, Downy Birch
- Juniperus communis, Common Juniper
- Larix decidua, European Larch, especially high light requirement
- Malus sylvestris, European Crab Apple
- Pinus mugo, Mountain Pine
- Pinus nigra, European Black Pine
- Pinus sylvestris, Scots Pine
- Populus alba, Silver Poplar
- Populus nigra, Black Poplar
- Populus tremula, Aspen
- Quercus pubescens, Downy Oak
- Quercus robur, Pedunculate Oak
- Salix alba, White Willow
- Salix caprea, Goat Willow
- Salix fragilis, Crack Willow
