= Proteak =

Mexican forestry company

Proteak Renewable Forestry
- Company type: Public
- Traded as: BMV: TEAK CPO
- Industry: Forestry, Timber
- Founded: 2001
- Headquarters: Mexico City, Mexico
- Area served: North America
- Products: Plantation Teak
- Website: www.proteak.com

Proteak is a forestry company that cultivates teak trees on plantations located on reclaimed ranch lands in the dry tropical regions of Mexico and Latin America. Based out of Mexico City, Mexico, Proteak has satellite offices in Wimberley, Texas and Tepic, Mexico. At their manufacturing facilities, Proteak produces a range of teak products including: cutting boards, butcher blocks, decking, flooring and lumber.

== History ==
Proteak Renewable Forestry, SAPIB was founded in 2000 by Hector Bonilla and a group of investors in the US and Mexico. Forestry management operations began in 2000 with the planting of teak forests along the Pacific coast of Mexico. In 2006, Proteak began to offer its first commercial product lines.

In 2010, Proteak reported that having over 8,000 acres under cultivation on reclaimed ranch lands, while protecting roughly 2,000 of virgin tropical forests adjacent to those plantations. As part of the company's operating guidelines, Proteak preserves standing forests on the properties that it acquires. Proteak's sustainable practices have earned its plantations a Forest Stewardship Council certificate.

Proteak's IPO closed on June 30, 2010, selling approximately 79 million shares on the Mexican Stock Exchange.

== Plantation Teak ==
Due to the high demand for teak lumber, commercial forestry operations began to grow teak in dry tropical climates around the world throughout the 20th century. The deforestation of teak's natural range in Southeast Asia and trade sanctions imposed by the US Treasury Department, have not only served to drive the cost of teak higher, but have also led consumers to look for environmentally sustainable sources of tropical hardwood lumber. Plantation Teak can be cultivated sustainably and is typically priced substantially lower than old growth teak.

Although the world's largest remaining teak forests are located inside Burma, the human rights violations perpetrated by the government of Myanmar have cause some consumers to refer to teak from the region as "conflict teak."

Some rumors suggest that teak trees grown on a plantation exhibit lower densities than those grown in Southeast Asia. However, studies conducted by the USDA have found no significant correlation between growth rate and its density.

== Kitchen products ==
Proteak's most visible product line include cutting boards, butcher blocks, counter tops and other kitchen accessories. The timber used to manufacture these products comes entirely from Proteak's FSC certified plantations.

Teak is often used in kitchen applications because of its highly resilient characteristics compared to other hardwoods. Equipped with a naturally high level of oily resin called tectoquinone, teak wood has a unique ability to repel moisture, fungi, warping and rot. Plantation teak kitchen products are often popular with environmentally conscious chefs who prefer the material for its relatively small ecological footprint.

Compared with other sustainable options like bamboo, teak cutting boards and butcher blocks are often considered to result in less wear on knife blades. End grain cutting boards showcase the tree's natural rings and hide knife marks and wear. Other manufacturing styles, such as edge grain or face grain are generally more affordable thanks to the efficiency of their construction.

== Decking and lumber ==
Teak lumber and decking make up another prominent portion of Proteak's commercial offerings through it subsidiary Teakyard. Boards cut from teak logs exhibit an attractive golden or brown complexion with a tight grain pattern. Often used in the construction of boats, patios, and outdoor furniture, teak lumber is known for its ability to resist rot, warping and cracking.

Plantation teak lumber is also available at a significantly lower price than teak imported from Burma's old-growth forests. Likewise, it is often preferred by consumers who are looking for an ethical or environmentally friendly teak option for their construction project.

== Slow growth ==
"Slow growth" attempts to duplicate old-growth teak with the proper growing conditions. Proteak employs the slow growth process in the cultivation of its plantation teak by selecting plantation sites that mimic the soil and precipitation characteristics of Southeast Asia.

Proteak produces its timber without the use of fertilizers or irrigation, both of which speed up the growth of the wood and alter the teak's famous grain pattern.
