= Tectol =

Natural phenolic quinonoid compound found in Tectona grandis and other plants

Names
- IUPAC name 5-(6-Hydroxy-2,2-dimethylbenzo[h]chromen-5-yl)-2,2-dimethylbenzo[h]chromen-6-ol

Identifiers
CAS Number	24449-39-6
3D model (JSmol)	Interactive image
ChEMBL	ChEMBL461704
ChemSpider	141818
PubChem CID	161453
CompTox Dashboard (EPA)	DTXSID30947318
- InChI: InChI=1S/C30H26O4/c1-29(2)15-13-21-23(25(31)17-9-5-7-11-19(17)27(21)33-29)24-22-14-16-30(3,4)34-28(22)20-12-8-6-10-18(20)26(24)32/h5-16,31-32H,1-4H3 Key: FVTJXDIACKJEPH-UHFFFAOYSA-N
- SMILES: CC1(C=CC2=C(O1)C3=CC=CC=C3C(=C2C4=C(C5=CC=CC=C5C6=C4C=CC(O6)(C)C)O)O)C

Properties
Chemical formula	C_{30}H_{26}O_{4}
Molar mass	450.534 g·mol^{−1}
- Except where otherwise noted, data are given for materials in their standard state (at 25 °C [77 °F], 100 kPa). Infobox references

Tectol is a naturally occurring polycyclic phenolic compound first isolated from the heartwood of teak (Tectona grandis). It is one of several quinonoid-related extractives present in teak heartwood and has also been reported from other plant species, including Lippia sidoides.

== Properties ==
The compound occurs together with other compounds such as tectoquinone, lapachol and deoxylapachol in teak heartwood, where these extractives are associated with the wood's high natural durability and resistance to biological degradation. It was first produced with total synthesis in 2012.

Laboratory studies have investigated tectol for biological activities, including antifungal, antiplasmodial and cytotoxic effects, although these findings are limited to experimental research.

== Black-streaked teak wood ==
Tectol has been proposed as a major contributor to the black-streak discoloration of teak heartwood. In oxidation experiments, tectol exhibited the greatest decrease in brightness among the isolated extractives. It was found that tectol is readily oxidized and undergoes subsequent polymerization to form the dark-colored compounds associated with black-streaked teak, although the discoloration process likely involves additional extractive components.
