= Cutting board =

Kitchen implement

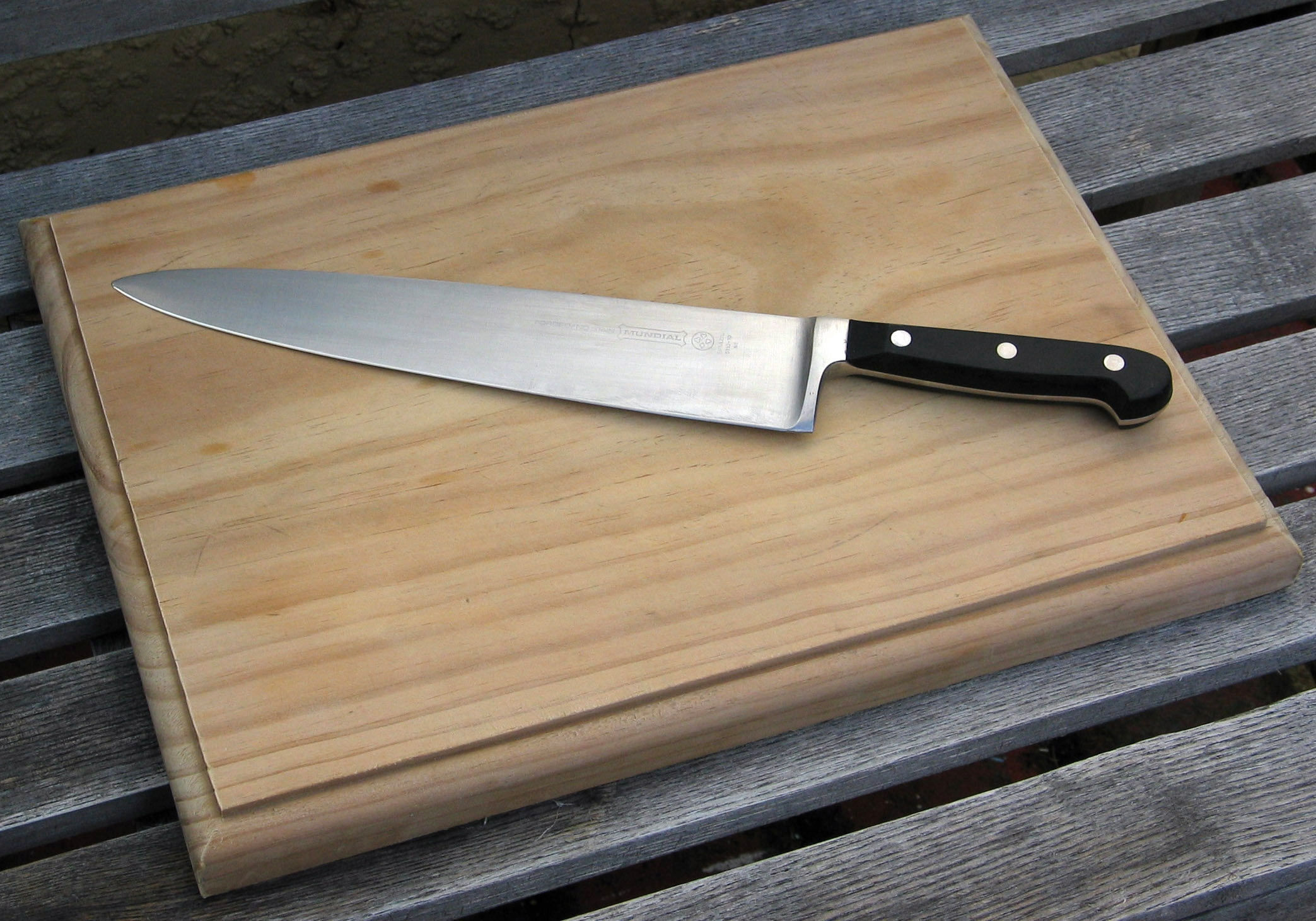
A kitchen knife on a wooden cutting board

A cutting board (or chopping board) is a durable flat surface on which to place material for cutting. The kitchen cutting board is commonly used in food preparation with knives; other types exist for cutting raw materials such as leather, rubber or plastic. Kitchen cutting boards are often made of a plank of hardwood or polyethylene, and come in various widths and sizes.

== History ==
Early cutting boards dated as far back to early 3000 BC. Cutting boards are and have been widely used. They could be seen in ancient Egypt and Greek and Roman kitchens. Early cutting boards were flat stones or large wooden slabs, likely emerging out of necessity. Wood soon became a preferred material for its durability and availability. With the advancement of technology and materials, plastic cutting boards soon gained popularity due to its lightness, and its low maintenance qualities.

== Materials ==
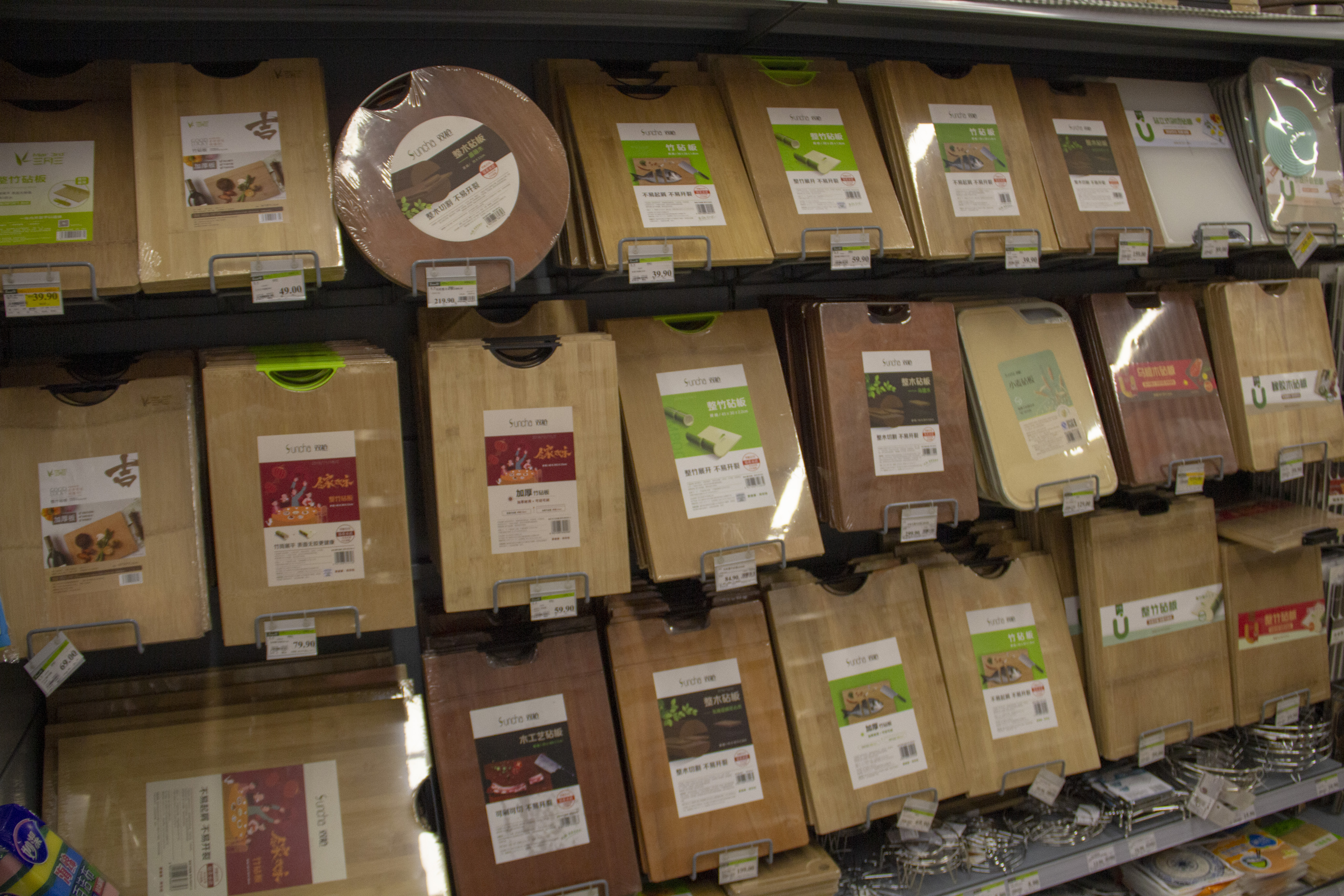
Different wood cutting boards on a store shelf

A knife edge is a delicate structure and can easily be blunted by a too abrasive surface. It can also be chipped if used on a surface that is too hard. A good cutting board material must be soft, easy to clean, and non-abrasive, but not fragile to the point of being destroyed. Hard cutting boards can, however, be used for food preparation tasks that do not require a sharp knife, like cutting cheese or making sandwiches.

=== Wood ===
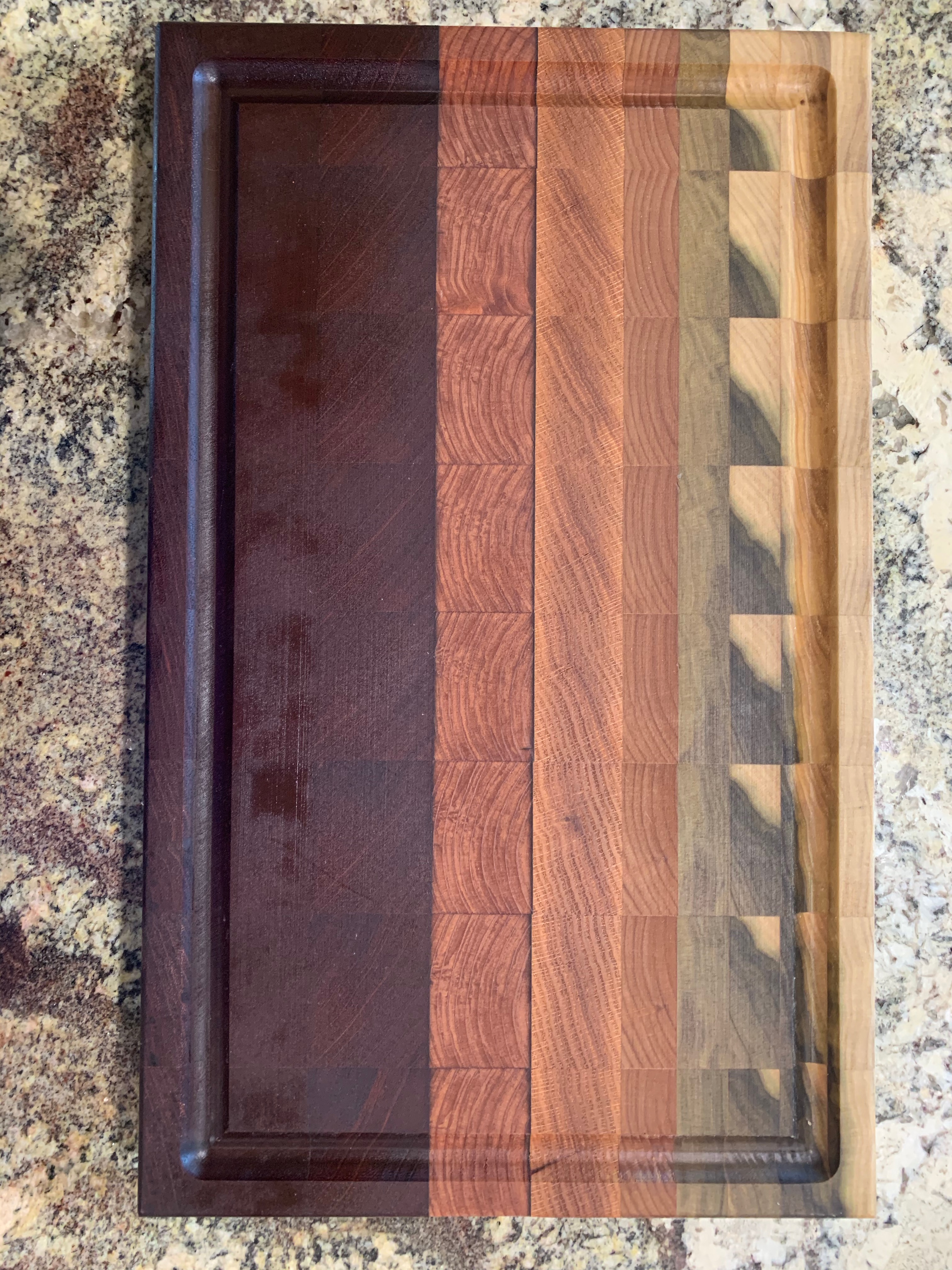
Freshly oiled cutting board

Wood has some advantages over plastic in that it is somewhat self-healing; shallow cuts in the wood will close up on their own. Wood also has natural anti-septic properties.

Hardwoods with tightly grained wood and small pores are best for wooden cutting boards. Good hardness and tight grain help reduce scoring of the cutting surface and absorption of liquid and dirt into the surface. Red oak, though a hardwood, has large pores which retain dirt even after washing. This makes it a poor choice for cutting-board material. Some ideal woods for cutting boards are birch wood, maple wood, cherry wood, and walnut wood. Teak's tight grains and natural coloration make it a highly attractive cutting-board material, both for aesthetic and durability purposes. Teak, a tropical wood, contains tectoquinone, a component of natural oily resins that repel moisture, fungi, warping, rot and microbes. Wooden boards can also be refinished with sanding and a reapplication of oil and wax.

Cutting boards with non-toxic natural waxes and oil coatings, such as linseed oil and beeswax are the most ideal.

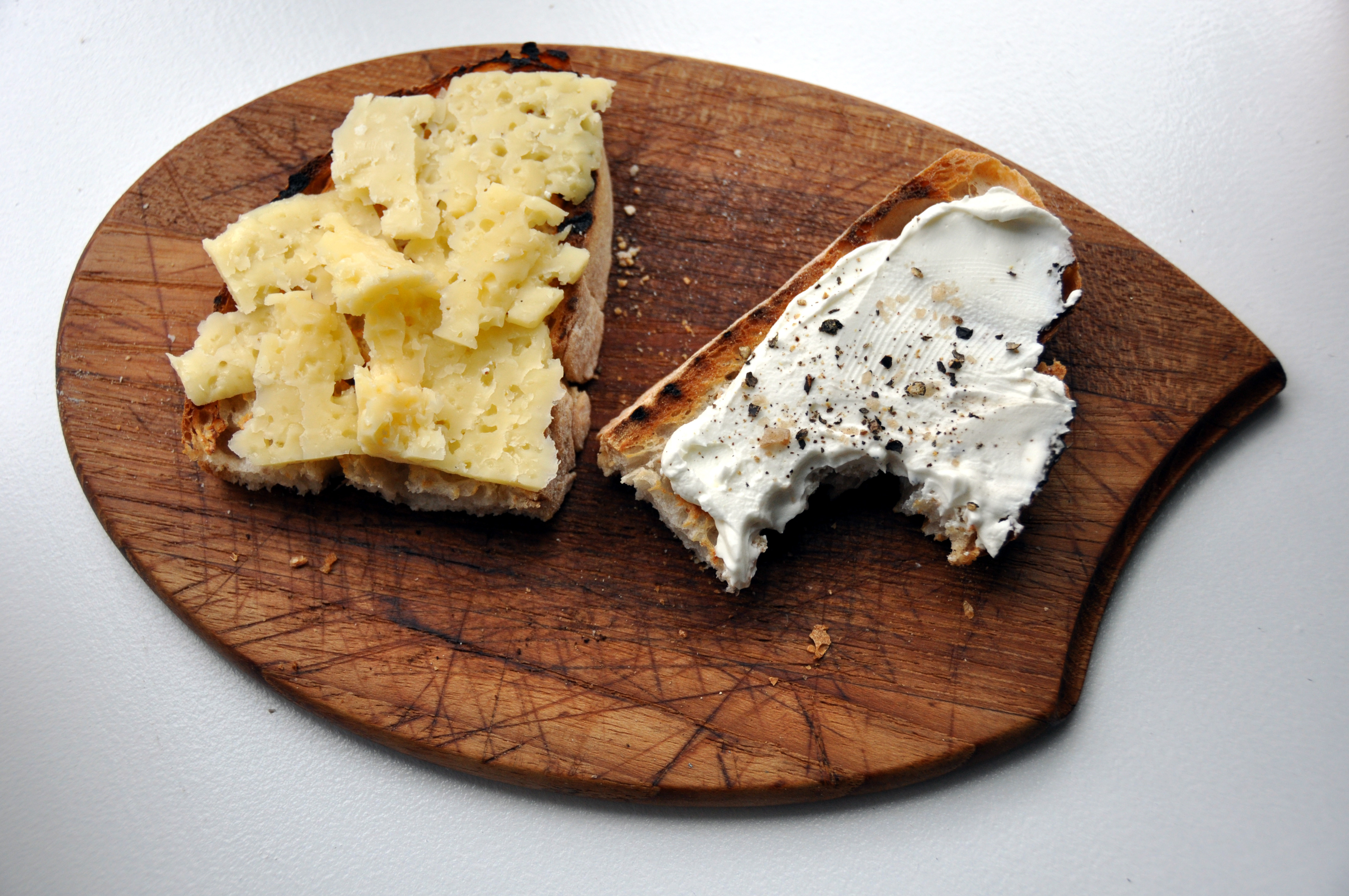
This wooden cutting board shows signs of scoring after repeated use.

Wood boards need to be cared for with an edible mineral oil to avoid warping, and should not be left in puddles of liquid. Ideally, they should be suspended freely while drying. Care must be taken when selecting wood, especially tropical hardwood, for use as a cutting board, as some species contain toxins or allergens.

Tamarind wood is a commonly used wood in southern India and is known for its durability and density. Often used commercially by butchers, tamarind wood is considered the go-to option by them. Tamarind wood, with its Janka hardness of more than 2000, is also considered one of the toughest woods. End grain cutting boards made from tamarind wood are durable and knife-friendly. They are also more affordable than teak options.

It is recommended to look for cutting boards made from a single piece of wood, opposed to multiple glued pieces. Cutting boards made from multiple glued pieces are more widely available, but it is important to make sure the glue used is free from formaldehyde and melamine.

=== Bamboo ===
Bamboo cutting boards are an alternative to plastic or glass cutting boards, partially because bamboo is commonly thought to be naturally antimicrobial (although studies show otherwise). During the harvesting process, bamboo is carefully chosen for maturation, markings, and size. The stalk is then cut into specific sizes and sent through a pressing process that strips the stalks into smaller plank-like pieces. Once the bamboo is pliable, a cutting board can be produced from multiple pieces by lamination. Bamboo has not been used historically in Asian nations due to its extreme hardness. Bamboo is less porous yet harder than hardwood cutting boards. Because of its hardness, it is resistant to scarring from knives. Furthermore, it absorbs little moisture and therefore is more resistant to bacteria than other woods.

=== Plastic ===
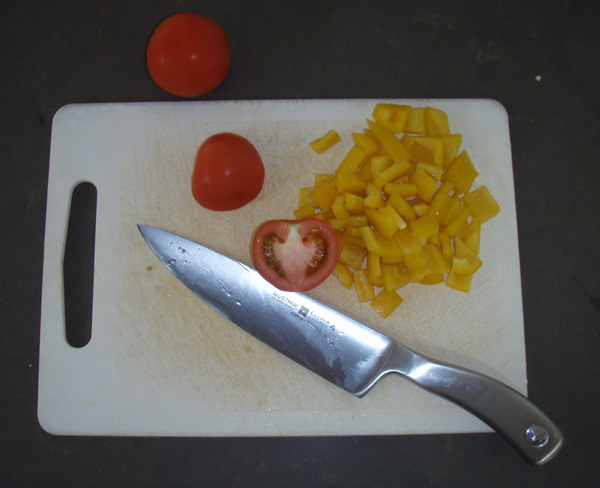
A plastic cutting board

Plastic boards are usually called PE (polyethylene) cutting boards, or HDPE (high-density polyethylene plastic), the material from which these boards are made. There are essentially two types of HDPE boards being made. One version is made from injection-molded plastic, while the other is HDPE from an extrusion line. Furthermore, researchers are now developing a cutting board made from HDPE plastic waste as a more environmentally friendly option. These cutting boards use calcium carbonate for filler, and glass fiber as reinforcement.

There are several certifications of plastic cutting boards, one being NSF, that certifies the plastic has passed requirements to come in contact with food. Unlike wood, plastic has no inherent antiseptic properties. However, unlike wood, plastic boards do allow rinsing with harsher cleaning chemicals such as bleach and other disinfectants without damage to the board or retention of the chemicals to later contaminate food.

Most HDPE boards are specifically designed to not dull the edge of a knife. If a score line is present, the knife is safe. A serrated knife should not be used on a plastic cutting board. The sharper the knife, the longer the cutting board will last. Semi-disposable thin flexible cutting boards also ease transferring their contents to a cooking or storage vessel.

=== Silicone ===
Like rubber, silicone is soft on the blade, while being just as self-healing and anti-bacterial as wood. Silicone is also heat-resistant, and lacks the rubbery smell of rubber boards.

=== Glass ===
While glass looks like an easy surface to keep clean, glass cutting boards can damage knives because of the high hardness of the material. Cutting on glass tends to dent, roll or even chip knife edges in a rapid manner. Additionally, if used for chopping instead of slicing, glass can shatter or chip itself, contaminating food.

=== Steel ===
Steel shares with glass the advantages of the durability and ease of cleaning, as well as the tendency to damage knives. Depending on the exact steel and heat treatment used, at best a steel cutting board will wear the edge on knives quickly; at worst chip, dent, or roll it like glass.

There are also cutting boards made of glass, steel, or marble, which are easier to clean than wooden or plastic ones such as nylon or Corian, but tend to damage blades due to their hardness. Rough cutting edges such as serrated knives abrade and damage a cutting surface more rapidly than do smooth-edged cutting implements.

== Hygiene ==
Sanitation with cutting boards is a delicate process because bacteria can reside in grooves produced by cutting, or in liquids left on the board. Harmful bacteria such as Salmonella, Escherichia coli, Listeria, and Staphylococcus can easily reside on a cutting board without proper care. Proper maintenance of a cutting board is essential to sustaining a safe cooking environment and preventing food borne illnesses.

=== Preventing cross contamination of food ===
Bacteria or allergens can easily be transmitted from one part of the kitchen to another or from one food to another via knives, hands, or surfaces such as chopping boards. To reduce the chance of this, it is advised to thoroughly wash and sanitize each cutting board after using it, and to use separate boards for different types of food such as raw meat, cooked meat, dairy and vegetables. It is recommended that plastic cutting boards be used for raw meat. This is because plastic cutting boards are non-porous and are less likely to harbor bacteria from raw meat. Many professional kitchens follow this standard colour-coding system:

- Blue cutting boards: raw seafood.
- Red cutting boards: raw meat.
- Green cutting boards: salads and fruits.
- Yellow cutting boards: cooked meat
- Brown cutting boards: root vegetables
- White cutting boards: dairy and bakery (also for universal if no other board is available.)

=== Care of boards ===
Regardless of the material, regular maintenance of a cutting board is important. A very diluted bleach solution is best for disinfecting cutting boards. The USDA recommends 1 part bleach to 256 parts water, 1 U.S. tablespoon of bleach per U.S. gallon of water. To remove odors, the board can be rinsed and then rubbed with coarse salt and left to stand for several minutes before being wiped and rinsed clean. On a wooden board, this procedure will also smooth minor surface imperfections. All cutting boards should eventually be replaced over time when they are excessively worn, or have hard-to-clean grooves.

==== Wooden boards ====
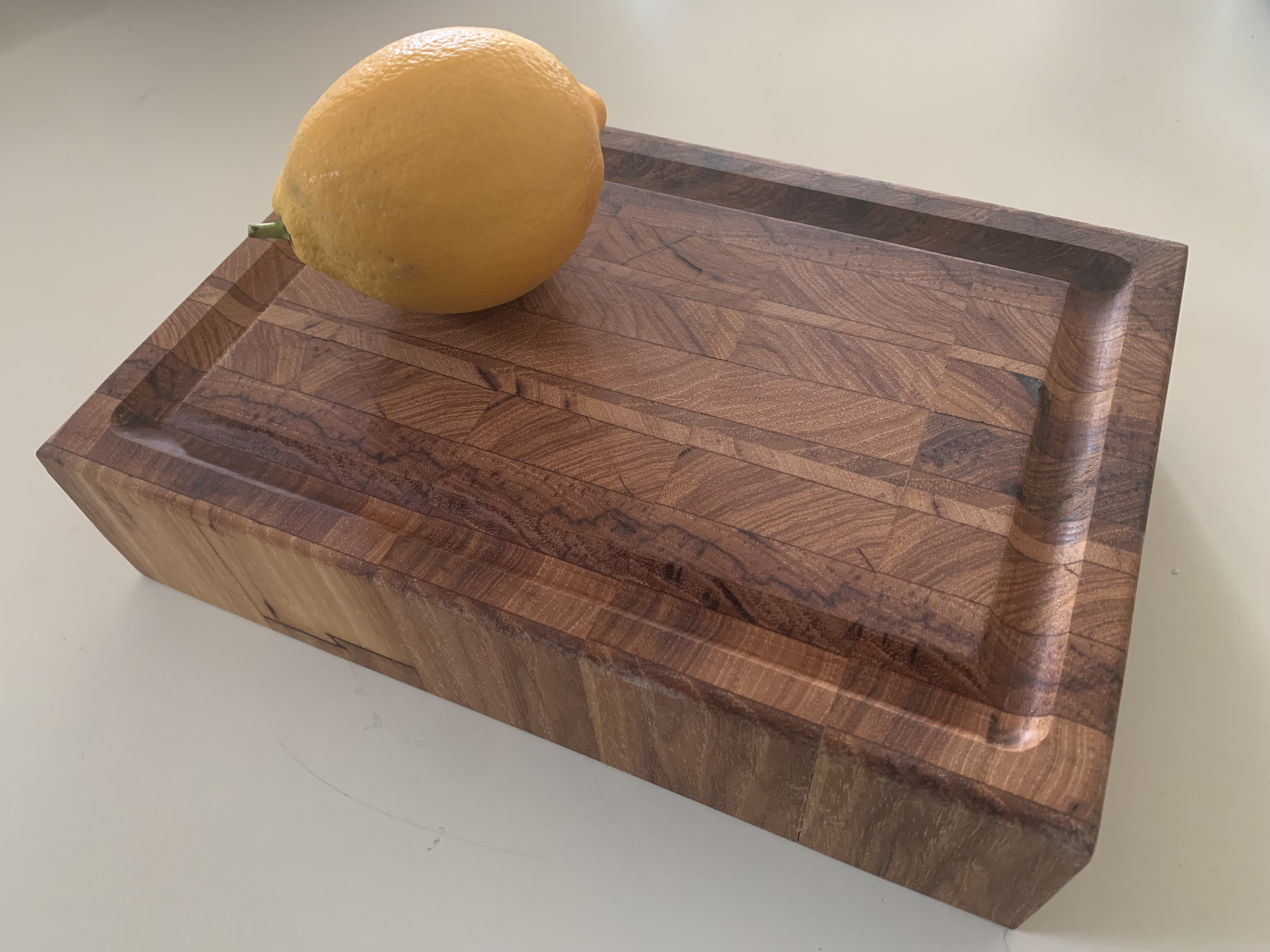
This upcycled cutting board was made from boxcar floorboards that were taken from a railroad salvage yard.

Wooden boards should never be placed in the dishwasher, or left immersed for long periods, as the wood or glue may be affected, or mildew may develop. To prevent cracking, wood cutting boards should be treated monthly under normal usage. A standard recommendation is 5–7 times a year, or as needed. A light food-grade mineral oil is a good preservative for wooden cutting boards, as it helps keep water from seeping into the grain. Alternatively, one may also use a food-grade drying oil such as poppyseed oil, tung oil, or linseed oil. The first two dry much faster than linseed. Note, plant-based oils will go rancid and cause wood cutting boards to pick up unpleasant smells. If the board picks up any food odors, there are a few ways to remove them. One way is a combination of lemon juice and kosher salt, and another is a solution of 1:3 distilled white vinegar and water. For the lemon and salt combo, sprinkle salt over the board, then squeeze lemon juice over it and rub the mixture into the board, letting it dry completely before scraping the dried paste off. On the other hand, a simple spray-and-wipe with the white vinegar and water solution removes any lingering odors.

Most commercially available linseed and tung oils are not “food grade”, as they contain metallic driers. In general, edible savory vegetable or olive oils are not recommended because they tend to go rancid, causing the board to smell and food to pick up the rancid taste. When heavily or deeply scored, wooden boards need to be resurfaced as scoring can harbour bacteria. Boards can be easily resurfaced with various woodworking tools, such as scrapers or planes, as well as sandpaper.

==== Plastic boards ====
Unlike wood, most plastic boards are non-porous, so bacteria cannot enter below the surface. It is still equally as important to clean the boards thoroughly after each use, as bacteria can lie and grow in any imperfections on the surface. Although many boards are dishwasher safe, both domestic and professional boards that are HDPE will be warped by the hot water, making them unsafe. When heavily or deeply scored, boards need to be resurfaced as deep scoring can harbor mildew and bacteria. However, resurfacing a plastic cutting board is quite difficult, and replacing it is recommended instead.

=== Bacterial contamination ===
A 1994 study found that wood was more likely to retain bacterial contamination, while another 1994 study found the opposite. Studies in 2002 and 2005 observed that bacterial populations declined faster on oak and pine than on plastic and other woods.

Another study in 2012 found that bamboo had high antimicrobial activity compared to wood.

In 2016, a literature review summarizing wood and microbial safety was published.

A 2020 study concluded that wood has antimicrobial properties as bacterial stains survived less time on wood surfaces compared to other materials which are stainless steel, polycarbonate, and aluminum.

== See also ==
- Butcher block
- Cutting mat
- Antique Breadboard Museum
