= Meathead =

Meathead may refer to:

- Matt Mitrione, an American mixed martial artist, and former NFL football player
- Michael Stivic, a character on the American sitcom All in the Family nicknamed "Meathead" by Archie Bunker
- The first stage name of rapper Future
- Meathead (Tom and Jerry), a grayish-brown alley cat who first appeared in the 1943 Tom and Jerry short "Sufferin' Cats!" and several shorts in both the classic and modern era
- "Meathead" Louis Green
- Moniker of Craig Goldwyn, an American food writer, chef, and website publisher
- Meatheads Burgers & Fries, a restaurant with ten locations in Illinois
- an extraterrestrial character in the film Meatballs Part II
- a person addicted to the illegal substance "meat" in The 80s: A Look Back at the Tumultuous Decade 1980–1989
