= Beer can chicken =

Barbecued chicken dish

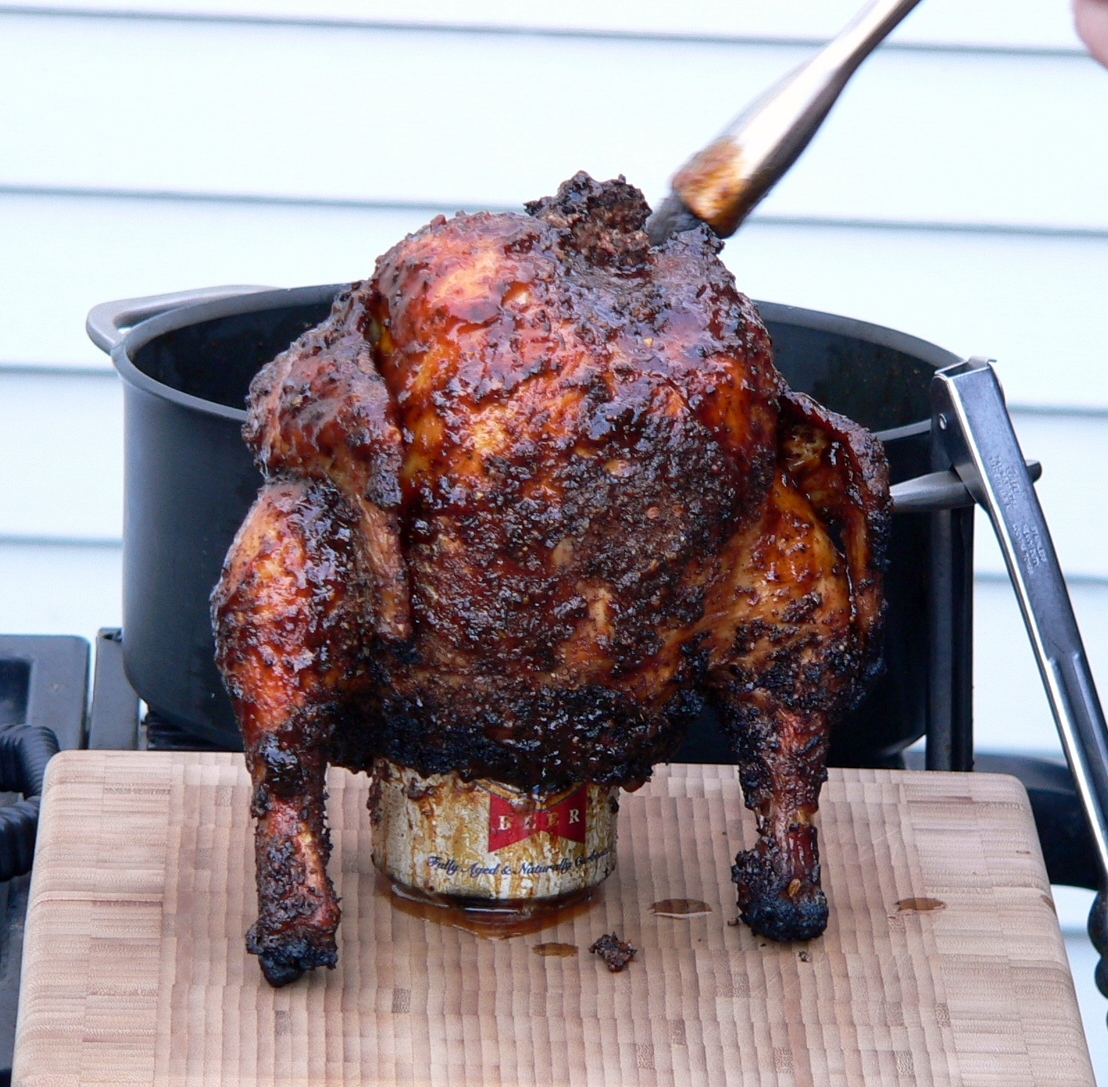
A beer can chicken after being grilled

Beer can chicken

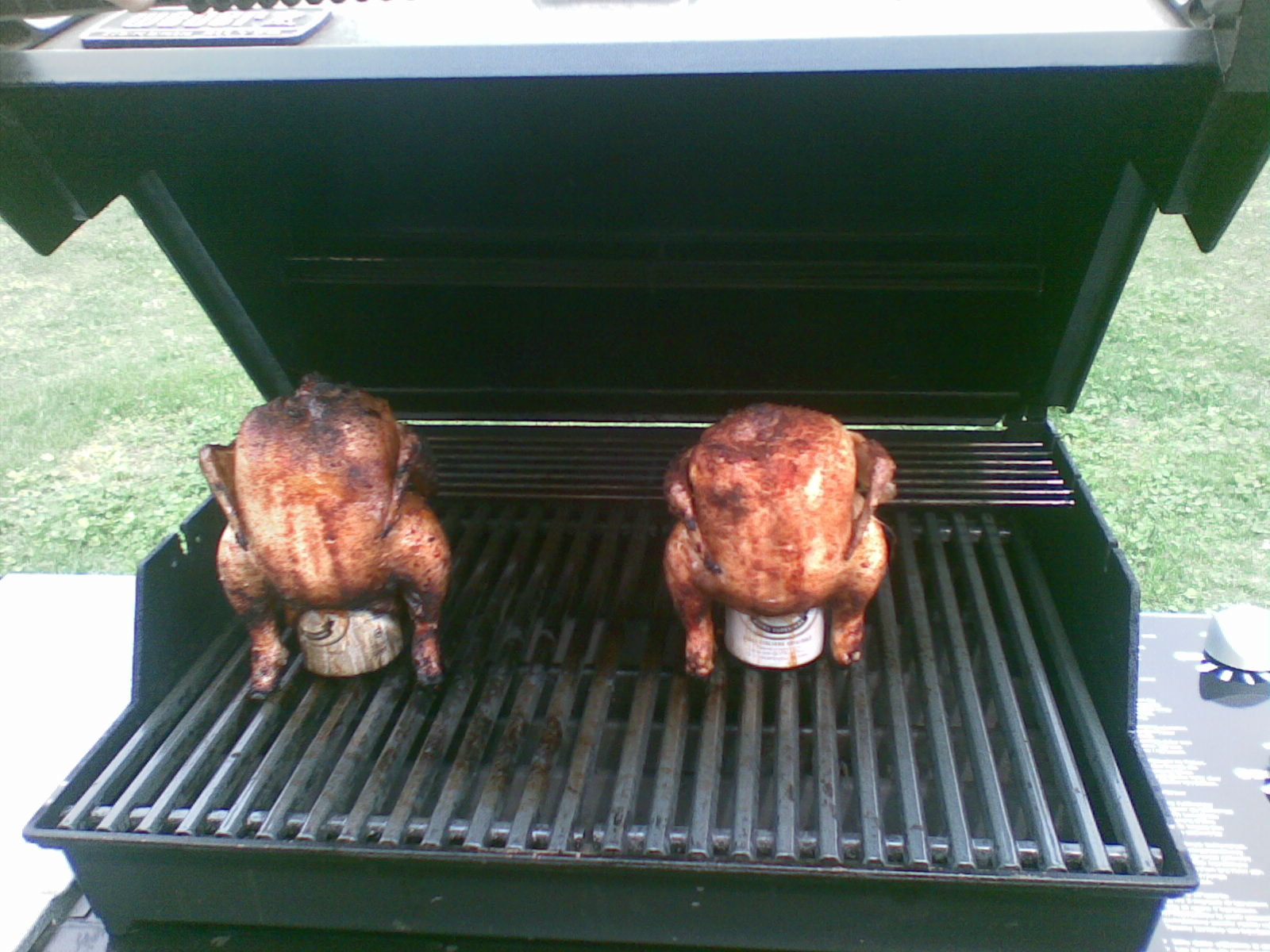
Beer can chicken cooking on a grill

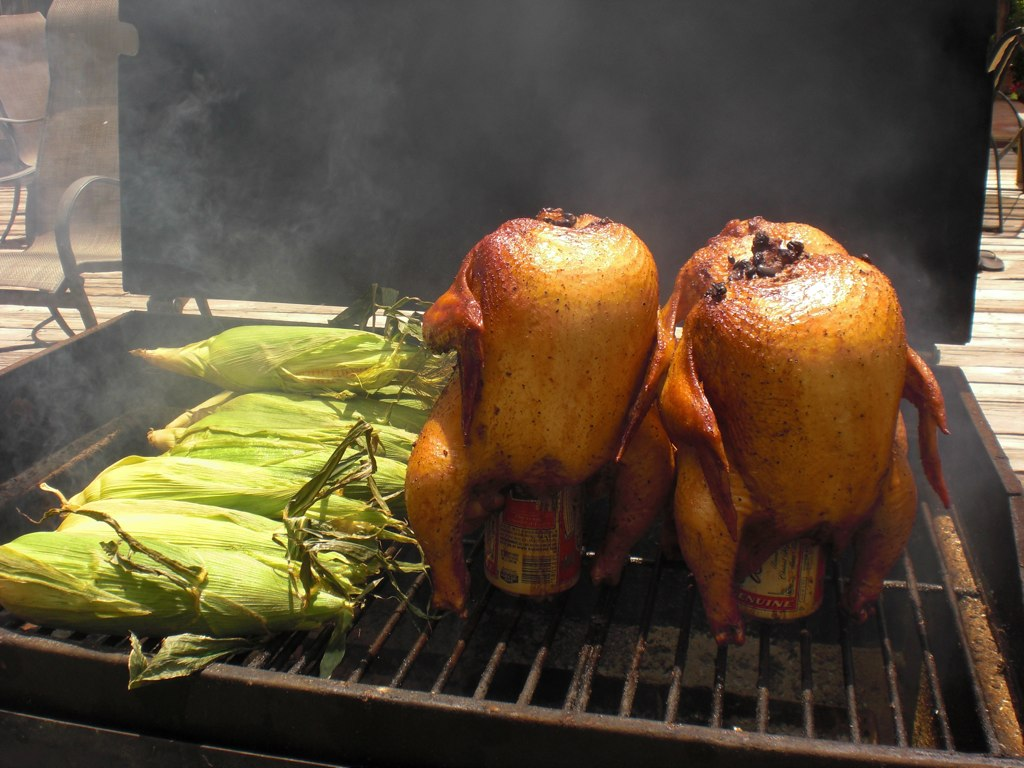
Beer can chicken being grilled with corn

Beer can chicken (also known as chicken on a throne, beer butt chicken, coq au can, dancing chicken) is a barbecued chicken dish and method of indirect grilling using a partially-filled can of beer that is placed in the chicken's cavity prior to cooking. The chicken is then stood up on the can and its legs vertically, and slow-cooked over indirect heat, usually over a propane gas or charcoal grill. It has been suggested that the dish possibly originated in the U.S. state of Louisiana.

The process is meant to add moisture to the dish, and some believe that steam from the beer serves to steam the chicken from the inside and add flavor to the dish. The efficacy of using the beer has been questioned, and the science behind the cooking process is debatable.

== Overview ==
Beer can chicken is a barbecued chicken dish and method of indirect grilling, in which an open can of beer or other canned beverage is inserted into the cavity of a chicken and then used to hold the chicken vertically while it cooks on a grill or in an oven. During the cooking process the beer in the can might steam, which might add moisture in the cavity of the bird, and some theorize that the beer vapor serves to add flavor to the dish. Because the chicken is in an upright position, the fat in the bird drains away and the skin is evenly cooked.

Prior to cooking, some of the beer in the can is typically removed, with a partially-full can of beer placed inside the bird's cavity. Some cooks use a full can of beer. Some cooks use a standard 12-ounce beer (355 ml) can, while others use a tallboy beer can, a larger-sized can. The chicken is sometimes coated with a spice rub prior to cooking, and some use marinated chicken.

The efficacy of the beer serving to steam a whole chicken from the inside while adding flavor has been questioned. (Note: "Whether the science behind this checks out or not is up for debate ...") Food writer Meathead Goldwyn says that the process may actually make the chicken drier compared to other types of roasting, with the beer never producing any steam: "You could grill chicken as long as you want, but even if you took it off at 160°F or 165°F, it doesn't matter. Beer doesn't boil until 212°F." Goldwyn considers the practice "dangerous" and "a waste of good beer".

== History ==
Barbecue author Steven Raichlen helped popularize the dish on a global level. He has promoted the dish since 1996, when he first observed its preparation in the Memphis in May World Championship Barbecue Cooking Contest. He has suggested that beer can chicken likely originated in the U.S. state of Louisiana. Raichlen has reported recipes for beer can chicken appearing around the same time in Mississippi, Texas, and Kansas. "There is a definite Louisiana connection." Famous barbecue judge Ardie Davis compared the emergence of beer can chicken to the domestication of animals: "It just happened everywhere at once."

Beer can chicken may have been prepared throughout the American South in the 1980s; however, the first documentation can be found in the Houston Chronicle in 1993. The recipe was given by Wayne Whitworth to George H. W. Bush when he and his brothers built a barbecue for the president. The barbecue pits were sent to Camp David at the beginning of President Bush's term.

== As fast food ==
In October 2014, Popeyes Louisiana Kitchen sold a limited edition beer can chicken dish that was produced without the use of beer. The dish consisted of sliced chicken breast meat marinated in a spice mixture designed to mimic the flavor of beer can chicken, which was then battered and deep fried. The spice mixture was composed of butter, onion, garlic, rosemary, lemon zest, cayenne pepper and a "secret ingredient" that Popeyes did not disclose. The company's chief marketing officer stated to a press source that the company had "... been working on the Beer Can Chicken for years".

== See also ==
- Beer bread
- Beer cake
- Beer soup
- List of chicken dishes
- Rotisserie chicken
- Barbecue in the United States

== Bibliography ==
- Raichlen, S.; Lambrenos, J. (2002). Beer-Can Chicken: And 74 Other Offbeat Recipes for the Grill. Workman Pub. ISBN 978-0-7611-2016-2.
