= Tree plantation =

Type of forest planted for high volume production of wood

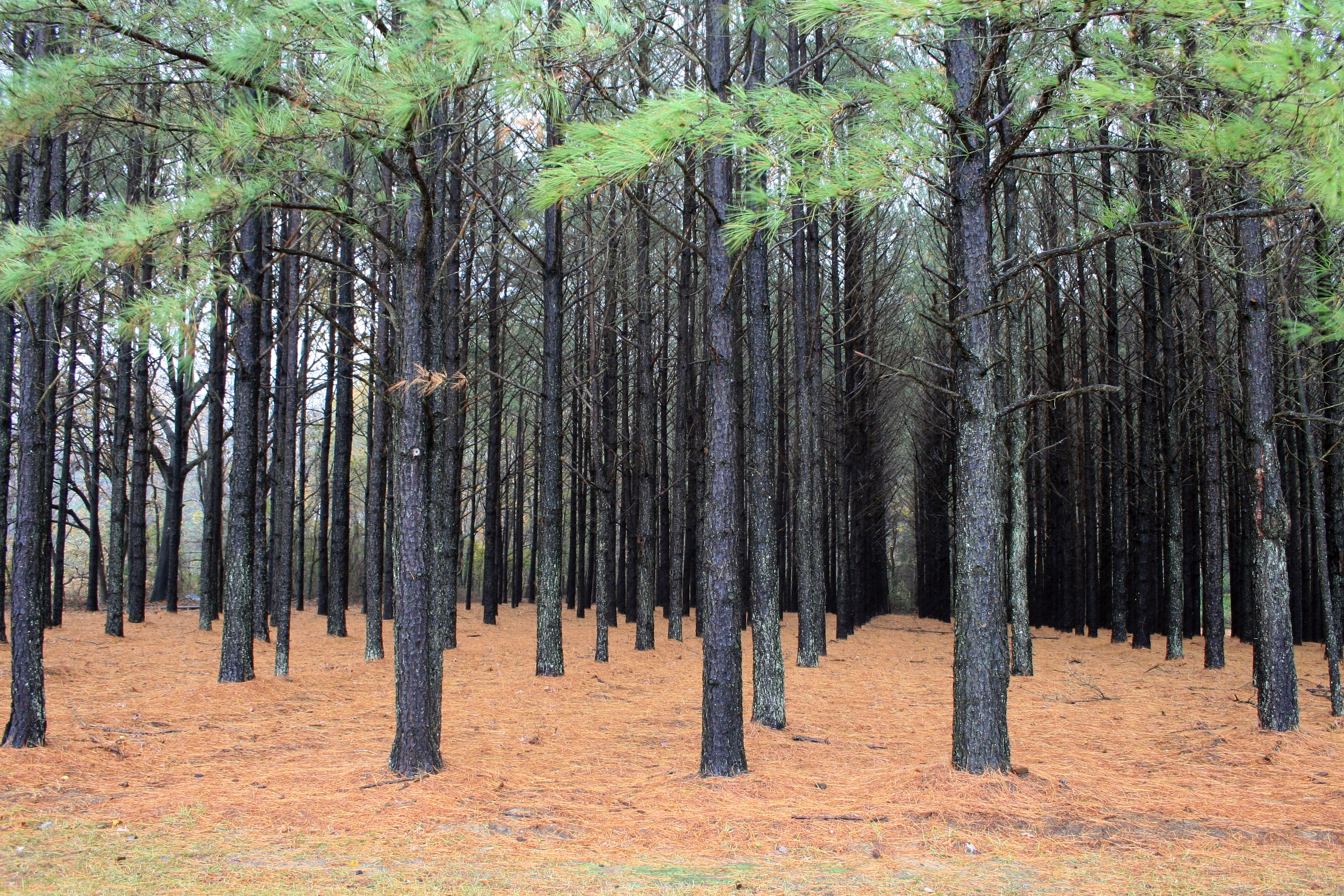
A pine plantation in the United States

A tree plantation, forest plantation, plantation forest, timber plantation, or tree farm is a forest planted for high volume production of wood, usually by planting one type of tree as a monoculture forest. The term tree farm also is used to refer to tree nurseries and Christmas tree farms. Plantation forestry can produce a high volume of wood in a short period of time. Plantations are grown by state forestry authorities (for example, the Forestry Commission in Britain) and/or the paper and wood industries and other private landowners (such as Weyerhaeuser, Rayonier, and Sierra Pacific Industries in the United States or Asia Pulp & Paper in Indonesia). Christmas trees are often grown on plantations, and in southern and southeastern Asia, teak plantations have replaced the natural forest.

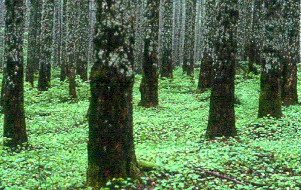
A plantation of Douglas-fir in Washington, U.S.

Industrial plantations are actively managed for the commercial production of forest products. Industrial plantations are usually large-scale. Individual blocks are usually even-aged and often consist of just one or two species. These species can be exotic or indigenous. The plants used for the plantation are often genetically altered for desired traits such as growth and resistance to pests and diseases in general and specific traits, for example in the case of timber species, volumic wood production and stem straightness. Forest genetic resources are the basis for genetic alteration. Selected individuals grown in seed orchards are a good source for seeds to develop adequate planting material.

Wood production on a tree plantation is generally higher than that of natural forests. While forests managed for wood production commonly yield between 1 and 3 cubic meters per hectare per year, plantations of fast-growing species commonly yield between 20 and 30 cubic meters or more per hectare annually; a grand fir plantation in Scotland has a growth rate of 34 cubic meters per hectare per year, and Monterey pine plantations in southern Australia can yield up to 40 cubic meters per hectare per year. In 2000, while plantations accounted for 5% of global forest, it is estimated that they supplied about 35% of the world's roundwood.

The highest share of plantation forest is in South America, where this forest type represents 99 percent of the total planted-forest area and 2 percent of the total forest area. The lowest share of plantation forest is in Europe, where it represents 6 percent of the planted forest estate and 0.4 percent of the total forest area. Globally, 44 percent of plantation forests are composed mainly of introduced species. There are large differences between regions: for example, plantation forests in North and Central America mostly comprise native species and those in South America consist almost entirely of introduced species.

== Growth cycle ==
- In the first year, the ground is prepared usually by the combination of burning, herbicide spraying, and/or cultivation and then saplings are planted by human crew or by machine. The saplings are usually obtained in bulk from industrial nurseries, which may specialize in selective breeding in order to produce fast growing disease- and pest-resistant strains.
- In the first few years until the canopy closes, the saplings are looked after, and may be dusted or sprayed with fertilizers or pesticides until established.
- After the canopy closes, with the tree crowns touching each other, the plantation is becoming dense and crowded, and tree growth is slowing due to competition. This stage is termed 'pole stage'. When competition becomes too intense (for pine trees, when the live crown is less than a third of the tree's total height), it is time to thin out the section. There are several methods for thinning, but where topography permits, the most popular is 'row-thinning', where every third or fourth or fifth row of trees is removed, usually with a harvester. Many trees are removed, leaving regular clear lanes through the section so that the remaining trees have room to expand again. The removed trees are delimbed, forwarded to the forest road, loaded onto trucks, and sent to a mill. A typical pole stage plantation tree is 7–30 cm in diameter at breast height (dbh). Such trees are sometimes not suitable for timber, but are used as pulp for paper and particleboard, and as chips for oriented strand board.
- As the trees grow and become dense and crowded again, the thinning process is repeated. Depending on growth rate and species, trees at this age may be large enough for timber milling; if not, they are again used as pulp and chips.
- Around year 10-60 the plantation is now mature and (in economic terms) is falling off the back side of its growth curve. That is to say, it is passing the point of maximum wood growth per hectare per year, and so is ready for the final harvest. All remaining trees are felled, delimbed, and taken to be processed.
- The ground is cleared, and the cycle can be restarted.

Some plantation trees, such as pines and eucalyptus, can be at risk of fire damage because their leaf oils and resins are highly flammable. Conversely, an afflicted plantation can in some cases be cleared of pest species cheaply through the use of a prescribed burn, which kills all lesser plants but does not significantly harm the mature trees.

== Types ==
=== Eucalyptus ===
In the 20th century, scientists around the world experimented with Eucalyptus species. They hoped to grow them in the tropics, but most experimental results failed until breakthroughs in the 1960s-1980s in species selection, silviculture, and breeding programs "unlocked" the potential of eucalypts in the tropics. Prior to then, as Brett Bennett noted in a 2010 article, eucalypts were something of the "El Dorado" of forestry. Today, Eucalyptus is the most widely planted type of tree in plantations around the world, in South America (mainly in Brazil, Argentina, Paraguay and Uruguay), South Africa, Australia, India, Galicia, Portugal and many more.

=== Teak ===
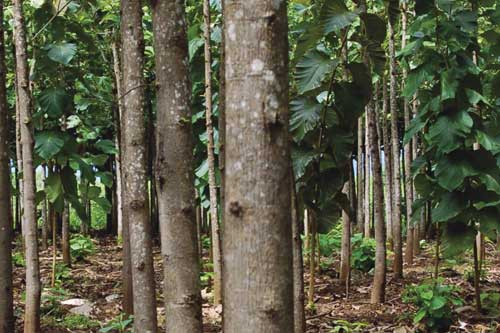
Teak tree plantation

Plantation teak is a tropical hardwood tree from the genus Tectona, endemic to Southeast Asia that is exclusively planted for the purpose of forestry management, for either commercial timber plantations or ecological restoration. Although the genus Tectona is native to the tropical regions of Southeast Asia, primarily Indonesia, Myanmar, India, Bangladesh and Thailand, the cultivation of plantation teak is economically viable in other tropical regions such as Central America.

=== Christmas tree farms ===
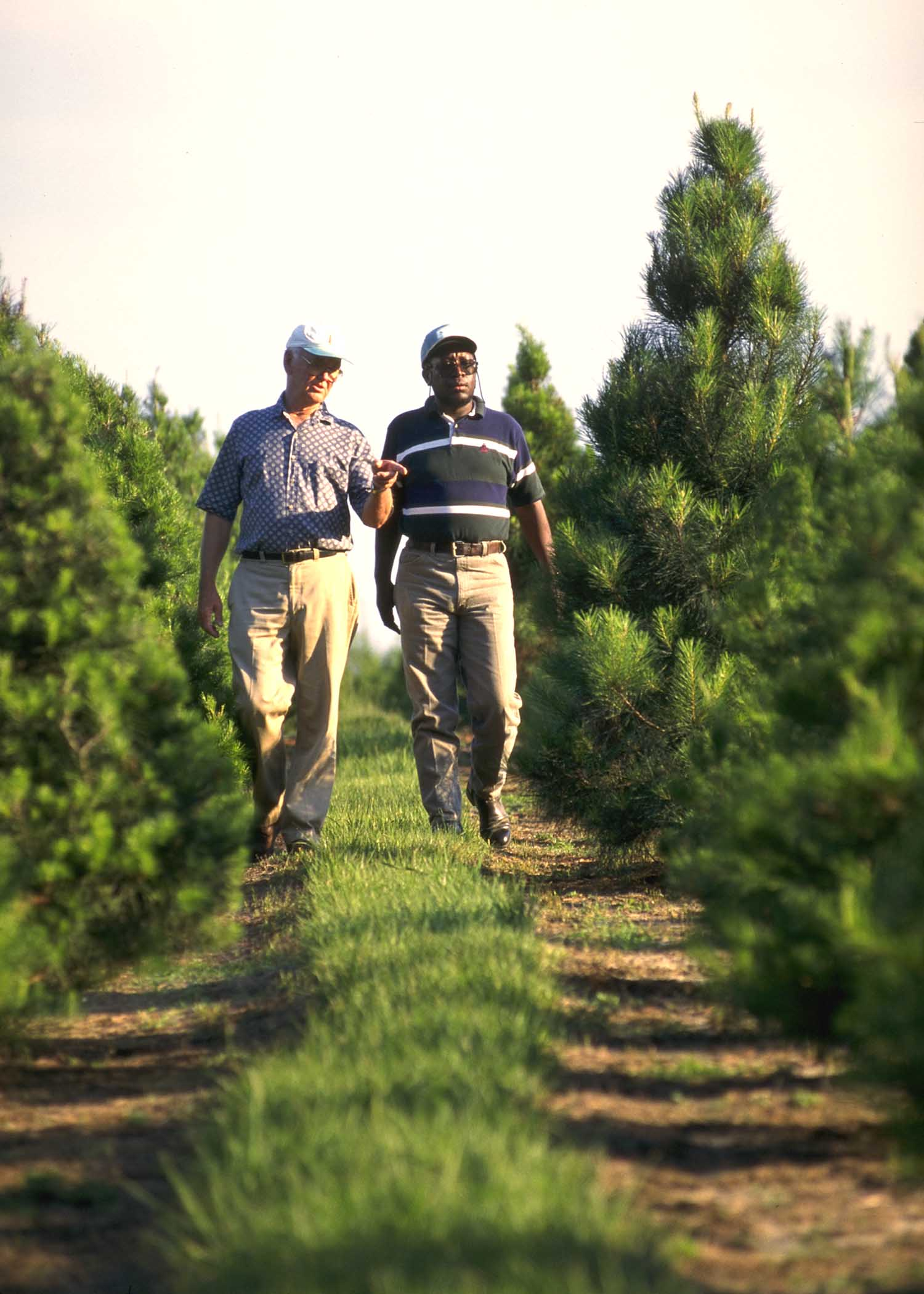
A Christmas tree farmer in the U.S. state of Florida explains the pruning and shearing process of cultivation to a government employee.

Christmas tree cultivation is an agricultural, forestry, and horticultural occupation which involves growing pine, spruce, and fir trees specifically for use as Christmas trees.

The first Christmas tree farm was established by 1860 in Maine, but most consumers continued to obtain their trees from forests until the 1930s and 1940s. Christmas tree farming was once seen only as a viable alternative for low-quality farmland, but that perception has changed within the agriculture industry. For optimum yield and quality, land should be flat or gently rolling and relatively free of debris and undergrowth.

A wide variety of pine and fir species are grown as Christmas trees, although a handful of varieties stand out in popularity. In the United States, Douglas-fir, Scots pine and Fraser fir all sell well. Nordmann fir and Norway spruce sell well in the United Kingdom, the latter being popular throughout Europe. Like all conifers, Christmas trees are vulnerable to a range of pests.

The final stage of cultivation, harvesting, is carried out in a number of ways; one of the more popular methods is the pick-your-own tree farm, where customers are allowed to roam the farm, select their tree, and cut it down themselves. Other farmers cultivate potted trees, with balled roots, which can be replanted after Christmas and used again the following year.

== Role in climate change mitigation ==
A forest sequesters carbon in its trees. The forest removes carbon dioxide from the air as trees grow and returns it to the air as trees die and rot or burn. As long as the forest is experiencing net growth, the forest is reducing the amount of carbon dioxide, the leading greenhouse gas, from the air. Furthermore, if timber is regularly removed from the forest and turned into lasting wood products, those products continue sequestering carbon, while the replacement tree farm trees absorb more carbon dioxide, thus effecting a continuous reduction in greenhouse gas. The fact that managed woodlands tend to be younger and younger trees grow faster and die less contributes to this distinction.

While tree farms absorb large amounts of CO_{2}, the long-term sequestration of this carbon depends on what is done with the harvested materials. Forests continue to absorb atmospheric carbon for centuries if left undisturbed.

A variety of analytical tools are used to quantify the carbon sequestration in forest, varying considerably in their detail and intended purpose.

== Natural forest loss ==
Many forestry experts claim that the establishment of plantations will reduce or eliminate the need to exploit natural forest for wood production. In principle this is true because due to the high productivity of plantations less land is needed. Many point to the example of New Zealand, where 19% of the forest area provides 99% of the supply of industrial round wood. It has been estimated that the world's demand for fiber could be met by just 5% of the world forest (Sedjo & Botkin 1997). However, in practice, plantations are replacing natural forest, for example in Indonesia. According to the FAO, about 7% of the natural closed forest being lost in the tropics is land being converted to plantations. The remaining 93% of the loss is land being converted to agriculture and other uses. Worldwide, an estimated 15% of plantations in tropical countries are established on closed canopy natural forest.

In the Kyoto Protocol, there are proposals encouraging the use of plantations to reduce carbon dioxide levels (though this idea is being challenged by some groups on the grounds that the sequestered CO_{2} is eventually released after harvest).

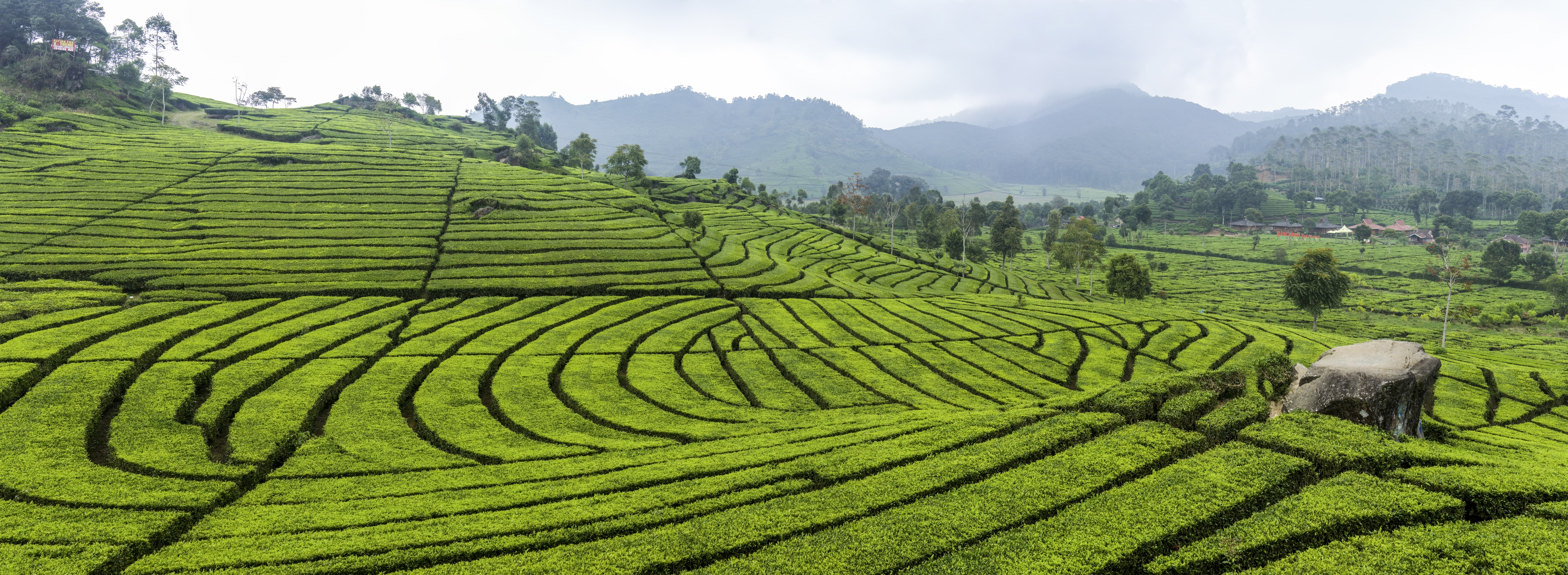
A tea plantation in Ciwidey, Bandung in Indonesia

== Ownership ==
As of 2019, an estimated 49% of forests in the United States are owned by families.

Notable corporations include Greenwood Resources, which is owned by TIAA.

== Problems ==
=== Monocultures ===
In contrast to a naturally regenerated forest, plantations are typically grown as even-aged monocultures, primarily for timber production. Plantations are always young forests in ecological terms. Typically, trees grown in plantations are harvested after 10 to 60 years, rarely up to 120 years. This means that the forests produced by plantations do not contain the type of growth, soil or wildlife typical of old-growth natural forest ecosystems. Most conspicuous is the absence of decaying dead wood, a crucial component of natural forest ecosystems.

Plantations are usually near- or total monocultures. That is, the same species of tree is planted across a given area, whereas a natural forest would contain a far more diverse range of tree species. While the establishment of large plantations sometimes implies a loss of biodiversity, studies have also shown that they can contribute to landscape diversity.

In the 1970s, Brazil began to establish high-yield, intensively managed, short rotation plantations. These types of plantations are sometimes called fast-wood plantations or fiber farms and often managed on a short-rotation basis, as little as 5 to 15 years. They are becoming more widespread in South America, Asia and other areas. The environmental and social impacts of this type of plantation has caused them to become controversial. In Indonesia, for example, large multi-national pulp companies have harvested large areas of natural forest without regard for regeneration. From 1980 to 2000, about 50% of the 1.4 million hectares of pulpwood plantations in Indonesia have been established on what was formerly natural forest land.

=== Social problems ===
The replacement of natural forest with tree plantations has also caused social problems. In some countries—again, notably Indonesia—conversions of natural forest are made with little regard for rights of the local people. Plantations established purely for the production of fiber provide a much narrower range of services than the original natural forest for the local people. India has sought to limit this damage by limiting the amount of land owned by one entity and, as a result, smaller plantations are owned by local farmers who then sell the wood to larger companies. Some large environmental organizations are critical of these high-yield plantations and are running an anti-plantation campaign, notably the Rainforest Action Network and Greenpeace.

=== Introduced species ===
In South America, Oceania, and East and Southern Africa, planted forests are dominated by introduced species: 88%, 75% and 65%, respectively. In North America, West and Central Asia, and Europe the proportions of introduced species in plantations are much lower at 1%, 3% and 8% of the total area planted, respectively.

Plantations may include tree species that would not naturally occur in the area. They may include unconventional types such as hybrids, and genetically modified trees may be used sometime in the future. Since the primary interest in plantations is to produce wood or pulp, the types of trees found in plantations are those that are best-suited to industrial applications. For example, pine, spruce and eucalyptus are widely planted far beyond their natural range because of their fast growth rate, tolerance of rich or degraded agricultural land and potential to produce large volumes of raw material for industrial use

== See also ==
- Afforestation – Establishment of trees where there were none previously
- Even aged timber management
- Forest farming
- Reforestation – Method for land and forest regeneration
- Orchard
- Wood industry
