= Loimulohi =

Finnish fish dish

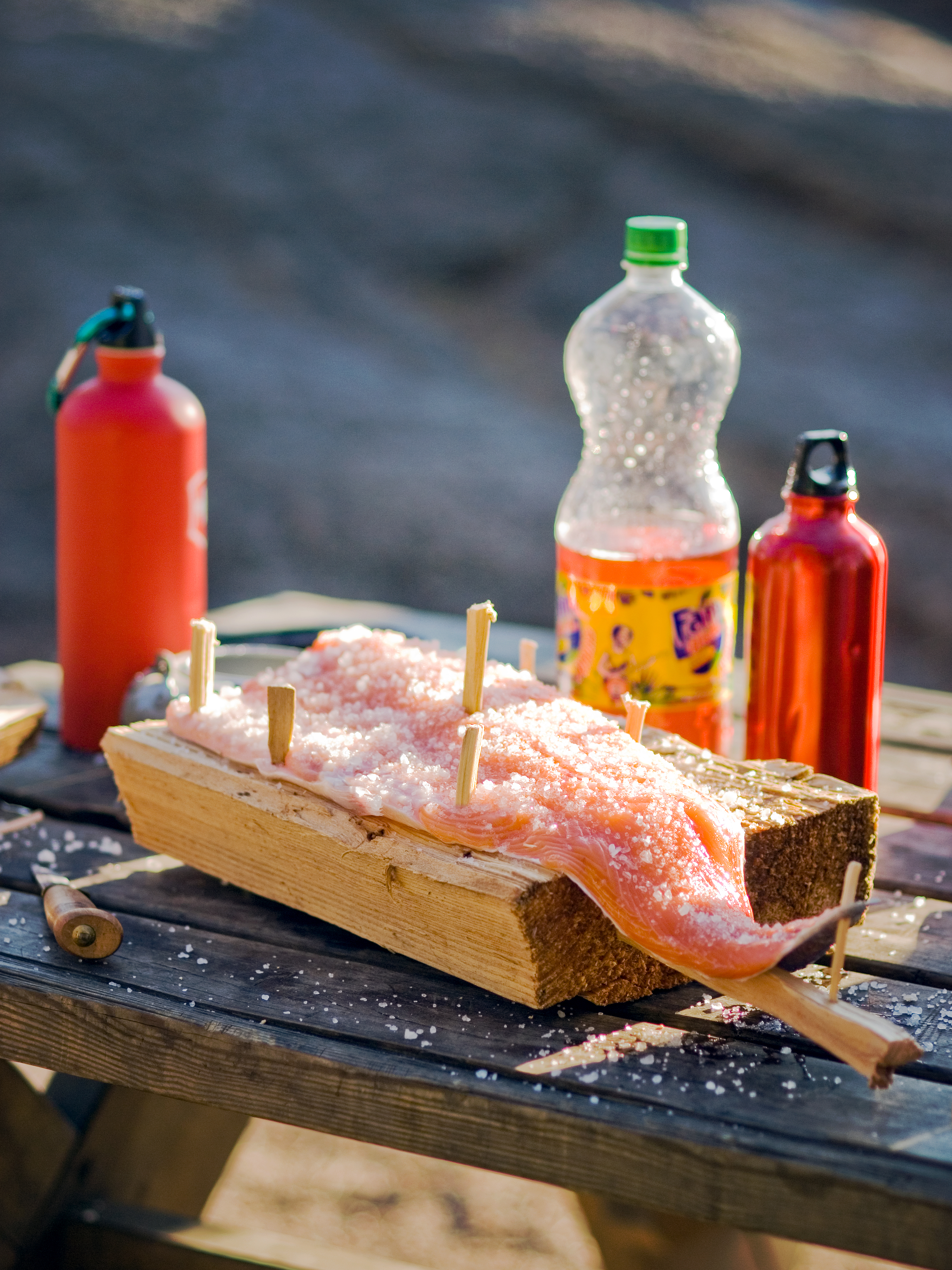
Rainbow trout nailed to a plank with wooden pegs and ready for cooking

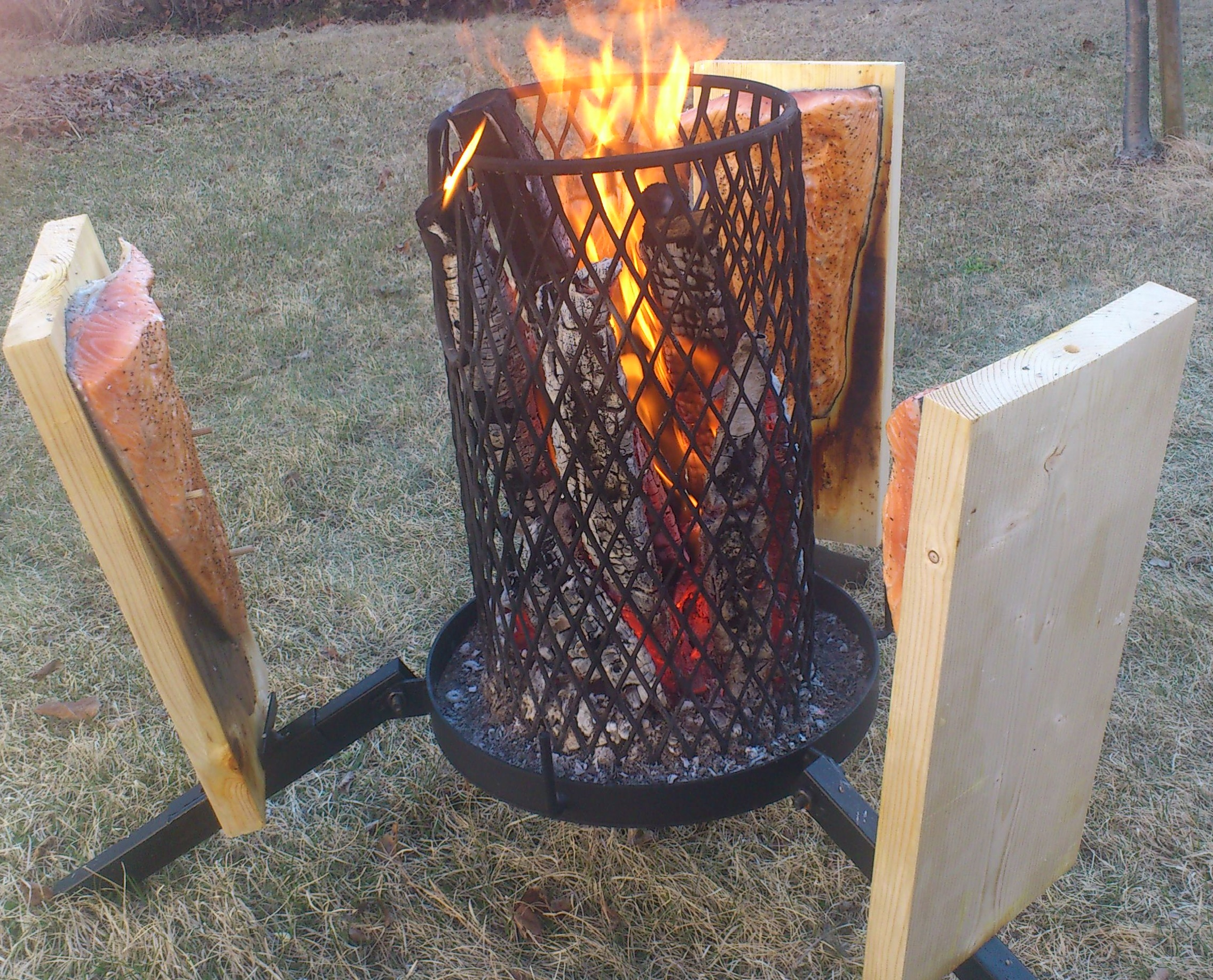
Blazing salmon with blazing equipment

Loimulohi (Finnish: [ˈloi̯muˌlohi]) or loimutettu lohi (lit. 'blazed salmon') is a Finnish fish preparation, in which salmon (or rainbow trout) is nailed to a plank with wooden pegs and cooked over the radiated heat from an open fire. Wooden pegs are used instead of regular nails because if used, the regular nails would get too hot and sear the meat around them, and in worst case the fish could fall to the ground. The planks are positioned vertically around the edge of the fire at an angle. Loimulohi has also been served as street food.

== See also ==
- Plank cooking
