= Beer soup =

Soup made from a beer-based roux

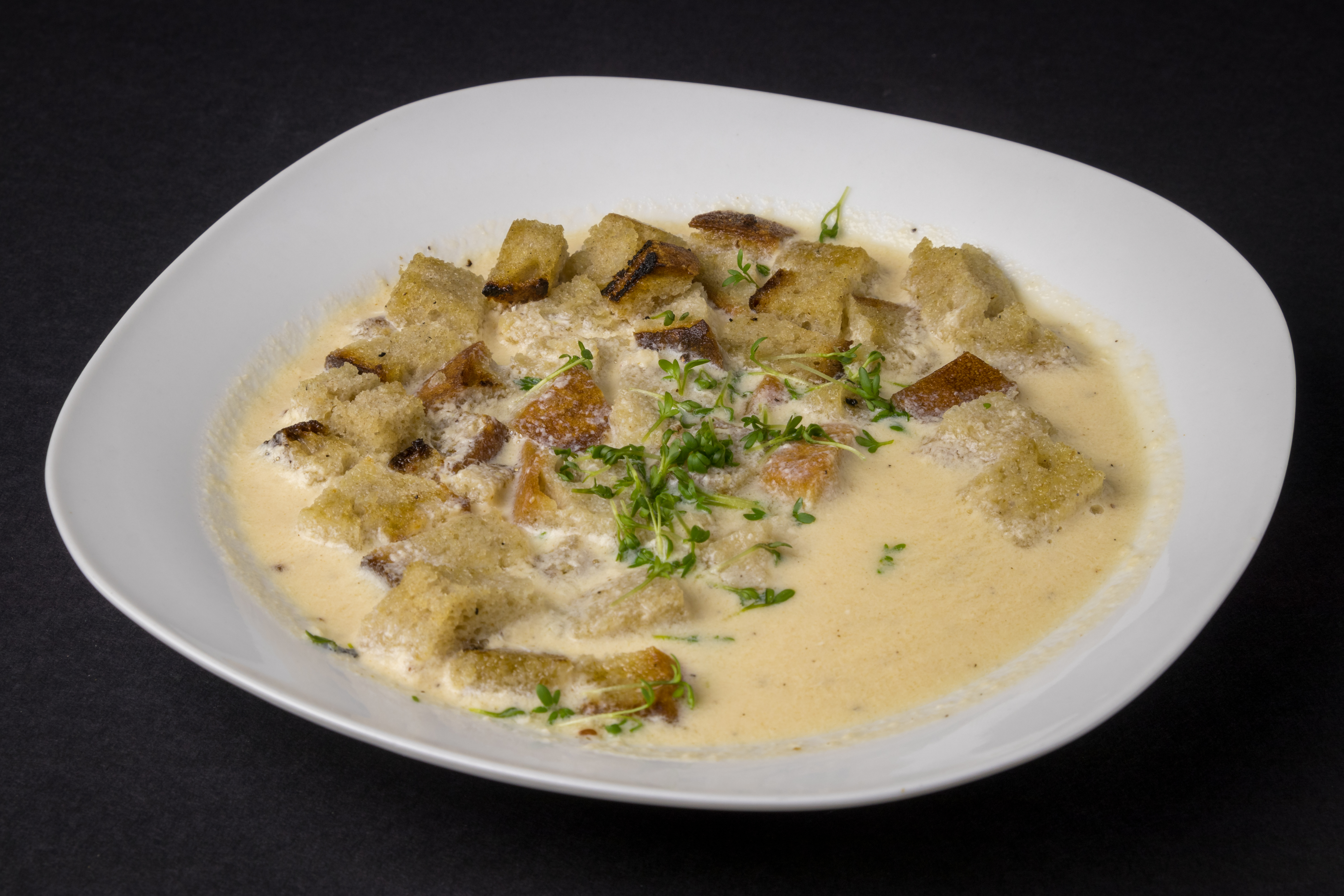
- Type: Soup
- Main ingredients: Roux, beer, cheese
- Variations: Use of potato as an ingredient and thickener, bratwurst

Beer soup (German: Biersuppe, Alsatian: Biersupp, Czech: Pivní polévka) is a soup which is usually roux-based and made with beer. In medieval Europe, it was served as a breakfast soup, sometimes poured over bread. A popular variant in Wisconsin restaurants and bars is called beer cheese soup, made with melted cheese, vegetables, and sometimes incorporating bratwurst.

Variations on the recipe use the starchiness of potato as a thickener. The Sorbian version is sweet, with cream and raisins added.

== See also ==
- Beer cake
- Beer can chicken
- List of soups
