= Beer cake =

Cake prepared using beer as a primary ingredient

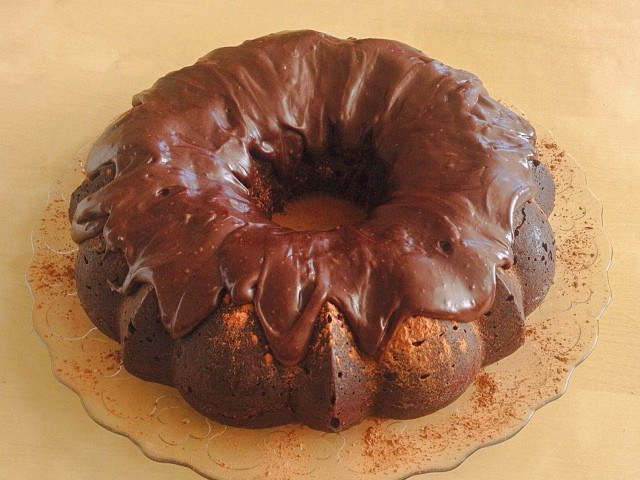
A chocolate bundt cake infused with stout beer

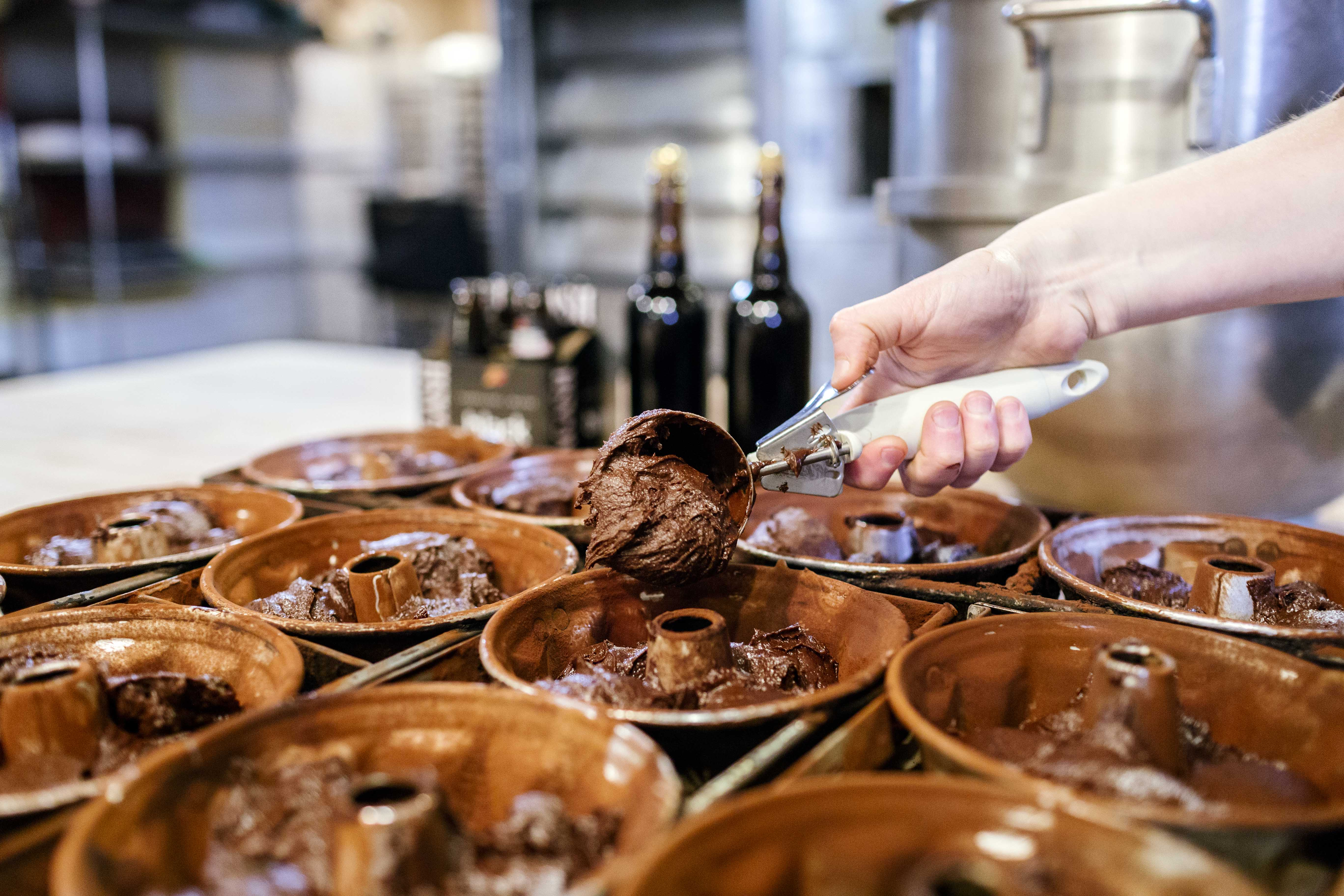
Chocolate cake batter that has been prepared using stout beer, being placed in pans

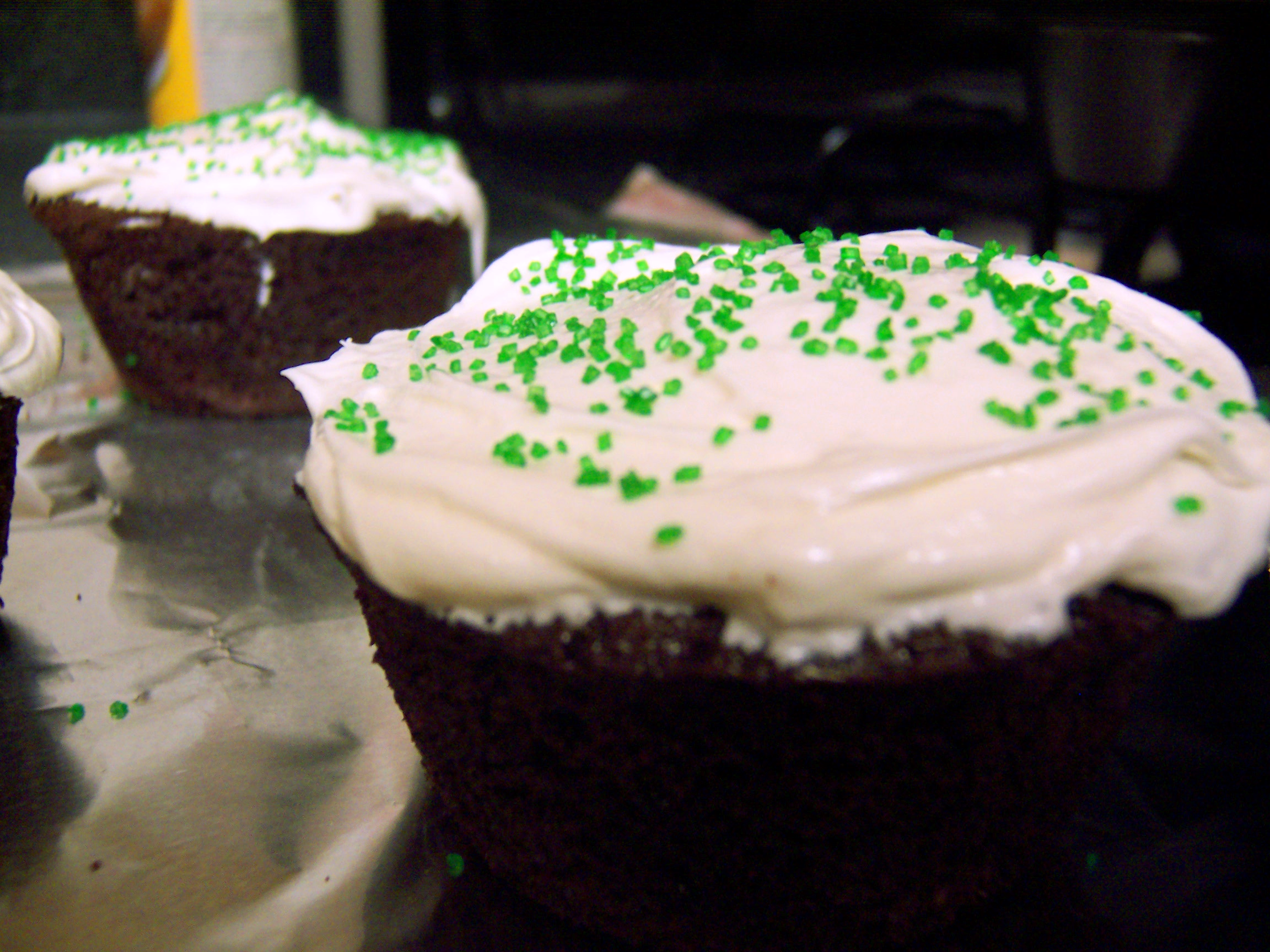
Cupcakes prepared with Guinness dry stout beer

Beer cake is a cake prepared using beer as a primary ingredient, and other typical cake ingredients. Chocolate beer cakes may include stout and chocolate stout beer, and some gingerbread cakes include beer in their preparation. The Rabha tribe in India uses a type of beer cake prepared with rice to create rice beer and fotika, a liquor. Beer cake variations exist, such as root beer cake.

== Overview ==
The beer used in a beer cake may impart a yeasty flavor to the cake. The icing on a beer cake may also be prepared using beer as a primary ingredient. Stout and chocolate stout beer is sometimes used in the preparation of chocolate beer cakes.

Preparation variations also exist, such as using fruit in beer cake's preparation, such as blueberries. A technique is to muddle fruit in a glass, to which beer is added, and the resulting mixture is then used as an ingredient in the batter of the cake. Fruit may also be used to garnish a beer cake.

== Bolo de cerveja ==
Beer cake in Brazil and Portugal may be referred to as "Bolo de cerveja".

== Gingerbread cake ==
Some gingerbread cakes are prepared as beer cakes with the addition of beer; the beer can serve to enhance the flavor and richness of the cake. In gingerbread cakes, use of a dark beer may increase the cake's flavor by complementing the spices used in the dish. Conversely, the use of various beer styles has the potential to a decrease the quality of a gingerbread cake. For example, the use of a lager can create a bitter cake, and use of a stout may imbue too much heaviness to the cake.

== Rice-beer cake ==
The Rabha tribe in the Goalpara district, State of Assam, India, commonly refers to rice-beer cake as bakhor, phap or surachi, where it is used to create rice beer, known as choko, which may then distilled to create a liquor called fotika. The rice-beer cake is prepared using rice that has been ground into a paste and several plants, which is mixed with cooked rice and previously prepared rice-beer cake. A type of cylindrical bamboo net called a janthi is placed inside of a vessel known as a jonga, and the rice-beer cake is placed in the jonga outside of where the janthi is placed. The jonga is carefully sealed with banana leaf that has been warmed by fire, and the mixture sits to ferment. After aging, the liquid in the janthi is drinkable as a rice beer. To create the fotika liquor, the liquid in the janthi has additional rice cake and water added to it, and it then sits to age some more. After this time, the mixture is then distilled to create the potent fotika liquor. People of the Rabha tribe believe that fotika has curative properties for people with psychiatric conditions.

== Root beer cake ==
Root beer cake is a type of beer cake prepared using root beer as a primary ingredient. Preparations of root beer may be non-alcoholic or alcoholic.

== Porter cake ==
Porter cake is a traditional Irish cake that some people say is associated with St Patrick's Day. It is a fruit cake traditionally made using the beer Porter, though stouts such as Guinness may be substituted.

== See also ==
- Beer can chicken
- Beer soup
- List of cakes
