= Plank (wood) =

Timber in the shape of long rectangular prisms

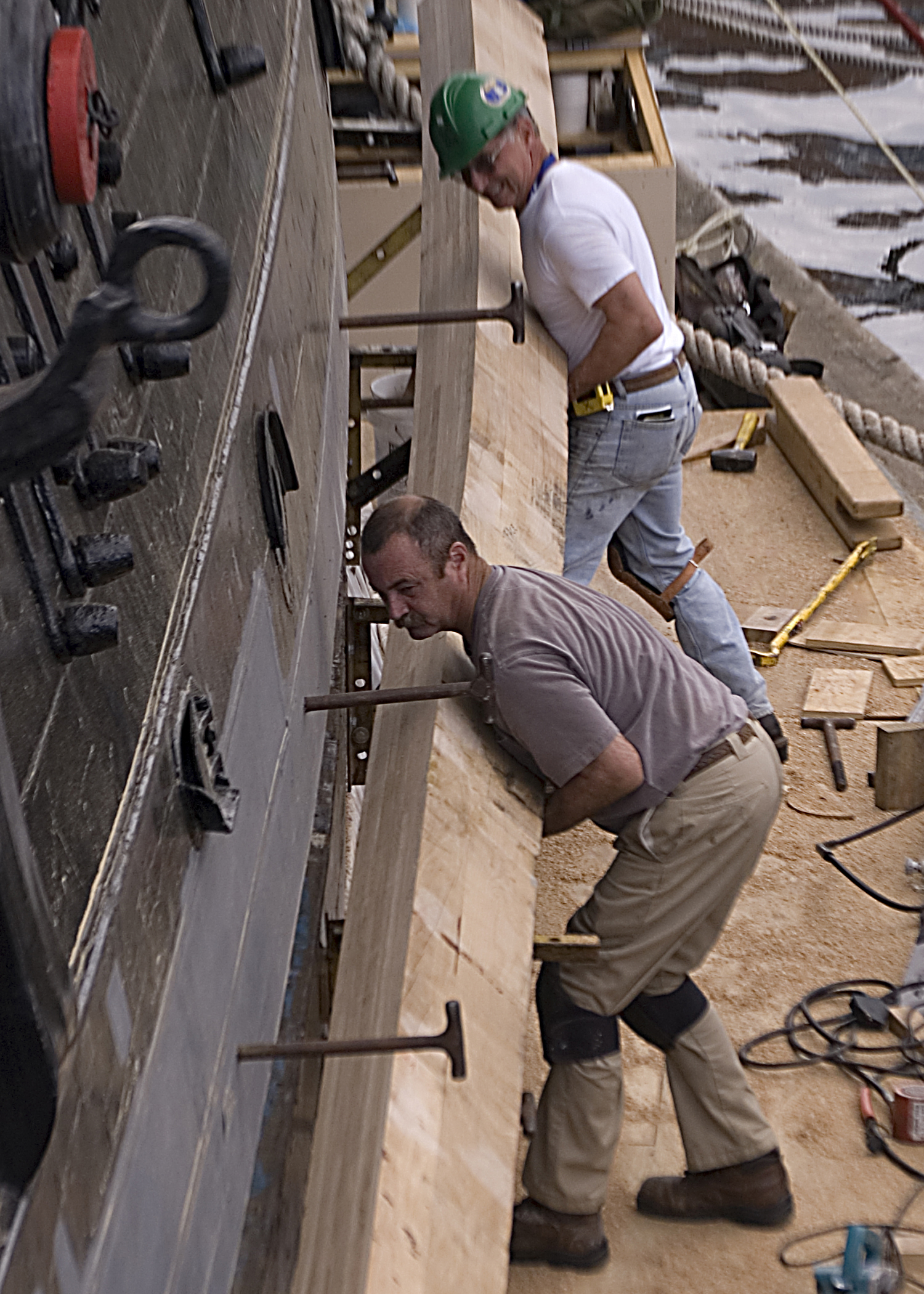
A plank used in the repair of a ship

A plank is timber that is flat, elongated, and rectangular with parallel faces that are higher and longer than wide. Used primarily in carpentry, planks are critical in the construction of ships, houses, bridges, and many other structures. Planks also serve as supports to form shelves and tables.

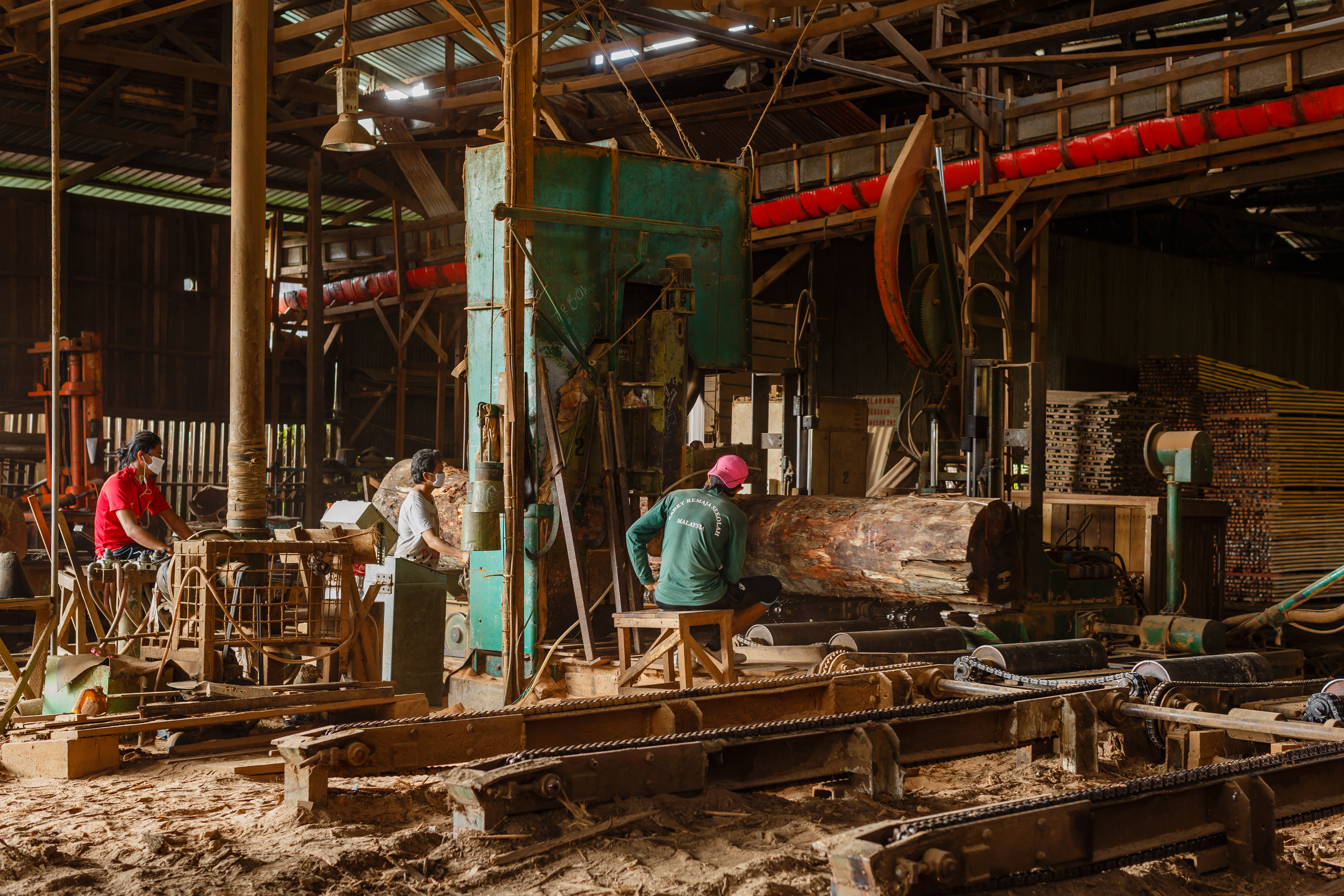
Cutting a log into planks in a sawmill

Usually made from timber, sawed so that the grain runs along the length, planks are usually more than 1 1/2 in (38 mm) thick, and are generally wider than 2 1/2 in (64 mm). Planks are often used as a work surface on elevated scaffolding, and need to be thick enough to provide strength without breaking when walked on. In the United States, planks can be any length and are generally a minimum of 2×8 (1 1/2 in × 7 1/4 in or 38 mm × 184 mm), but planks that are 2×10 (1 1/2 in × 9 1/4 in or 38 mm × 235 mm) and 2×12 (1 1/2 in × 11 1/4 in or 38 mm × 286 mm) are more commonly stocked by lumber retailers. Timber is categorized as a board if its width is less than 2 1/2 in (64 mm), and its thickness is less than 1 1/2 in (38 mm). In Germany, the national norm (DIN 68252) stipulates that the thickness of a plank (termed Bohle) must be 40 mm minimum.

A plank used in a building as a horizontal supporting member that runs between foundations, walls, or beams to support a ceiling or floor is called a joist.

The plank was the basis of maritime transport: wood (except some dense hardwoods) floats on water, and abundant forests meant wooden logs could be easily obtained and processed, making planks the primary material in ship building. However, since the 20th century, wood has largely been supplanted in ship construction by iron and steel, to decrease cost and improve durability.

== Gallery ==
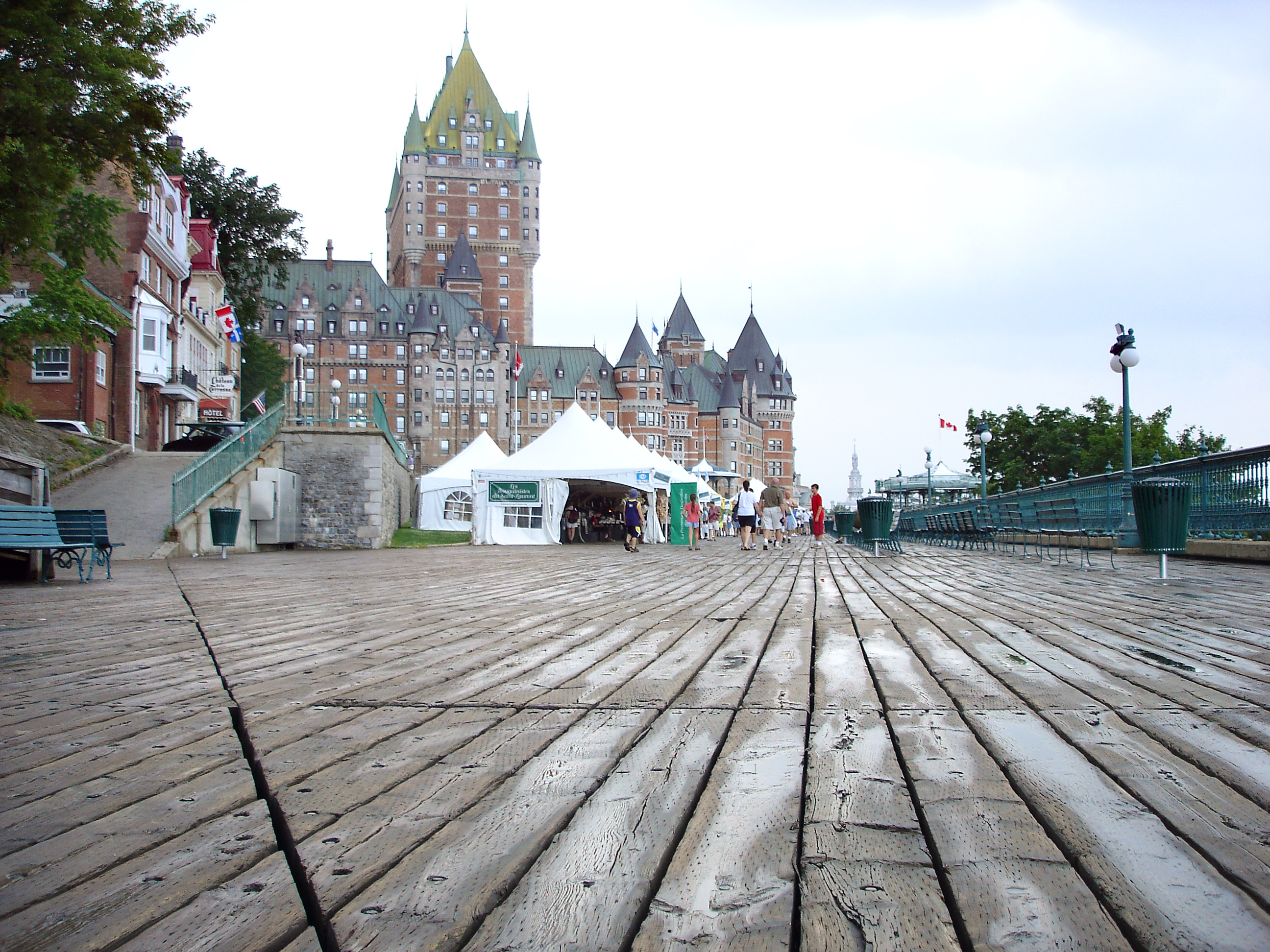
Plank boardwalk, Dufferin Terrace, Quebec City, Canada

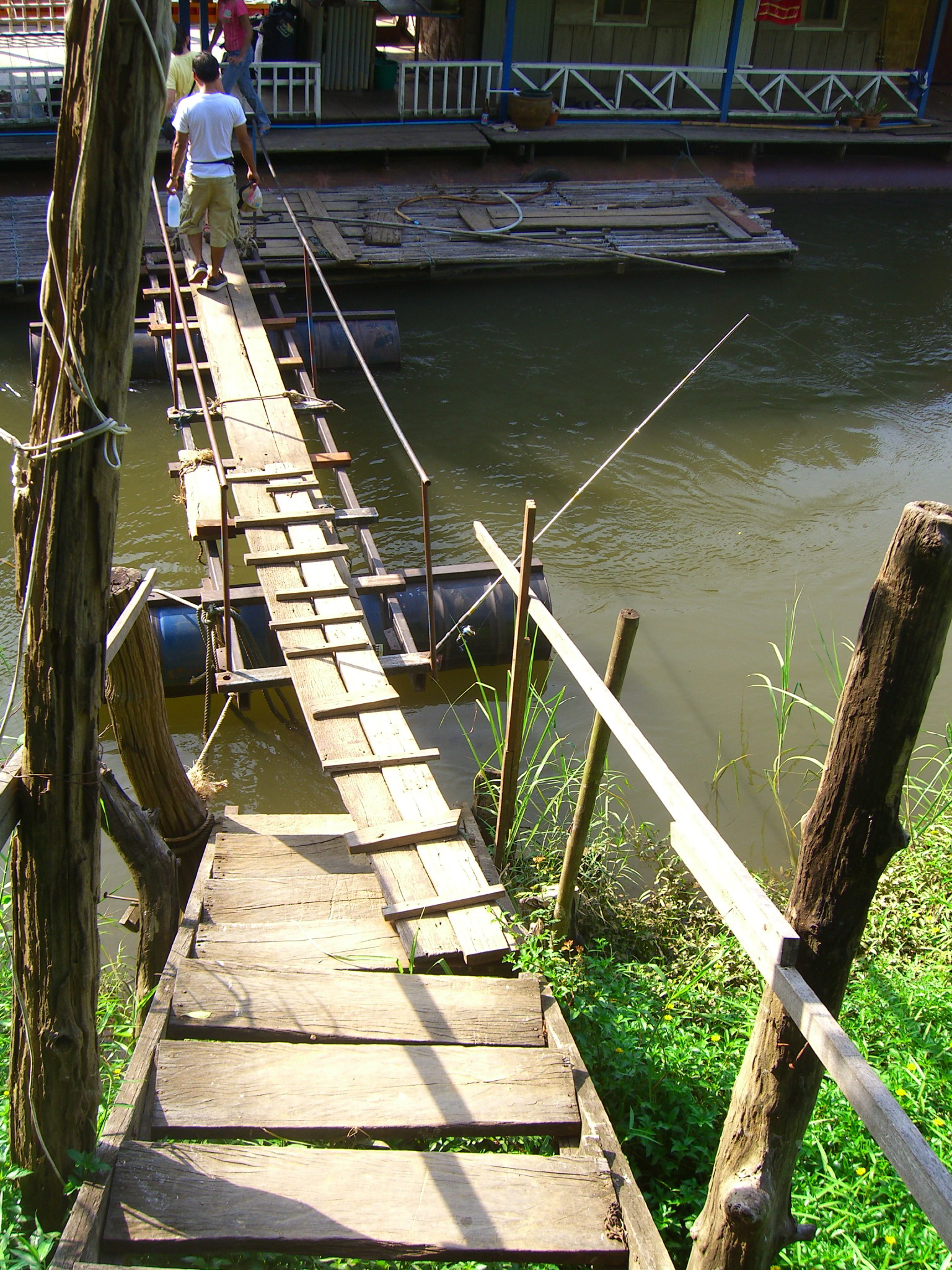
Plank footbridge, Thailand

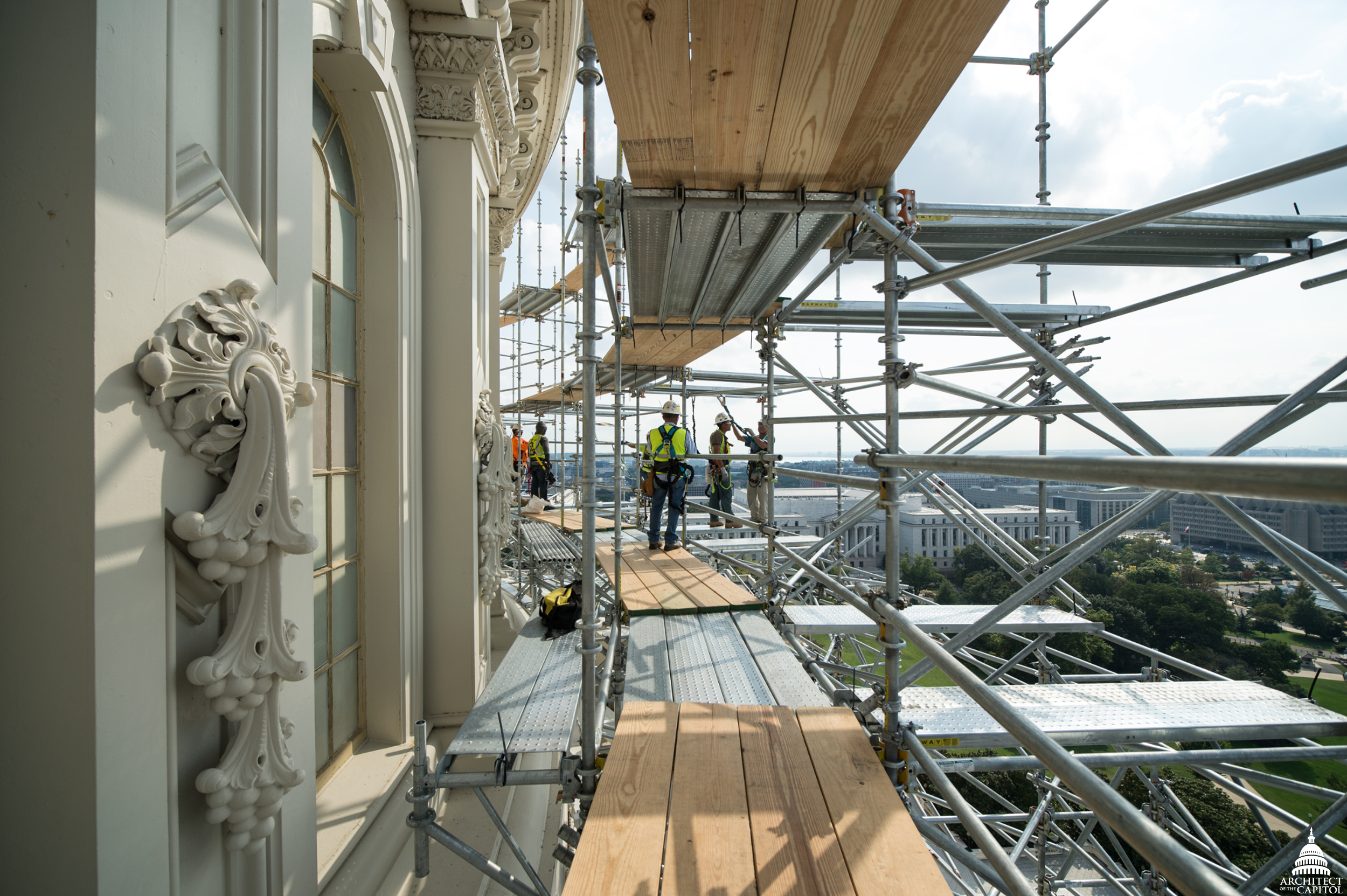
Planks on construction scaffold, Washington, DC, US

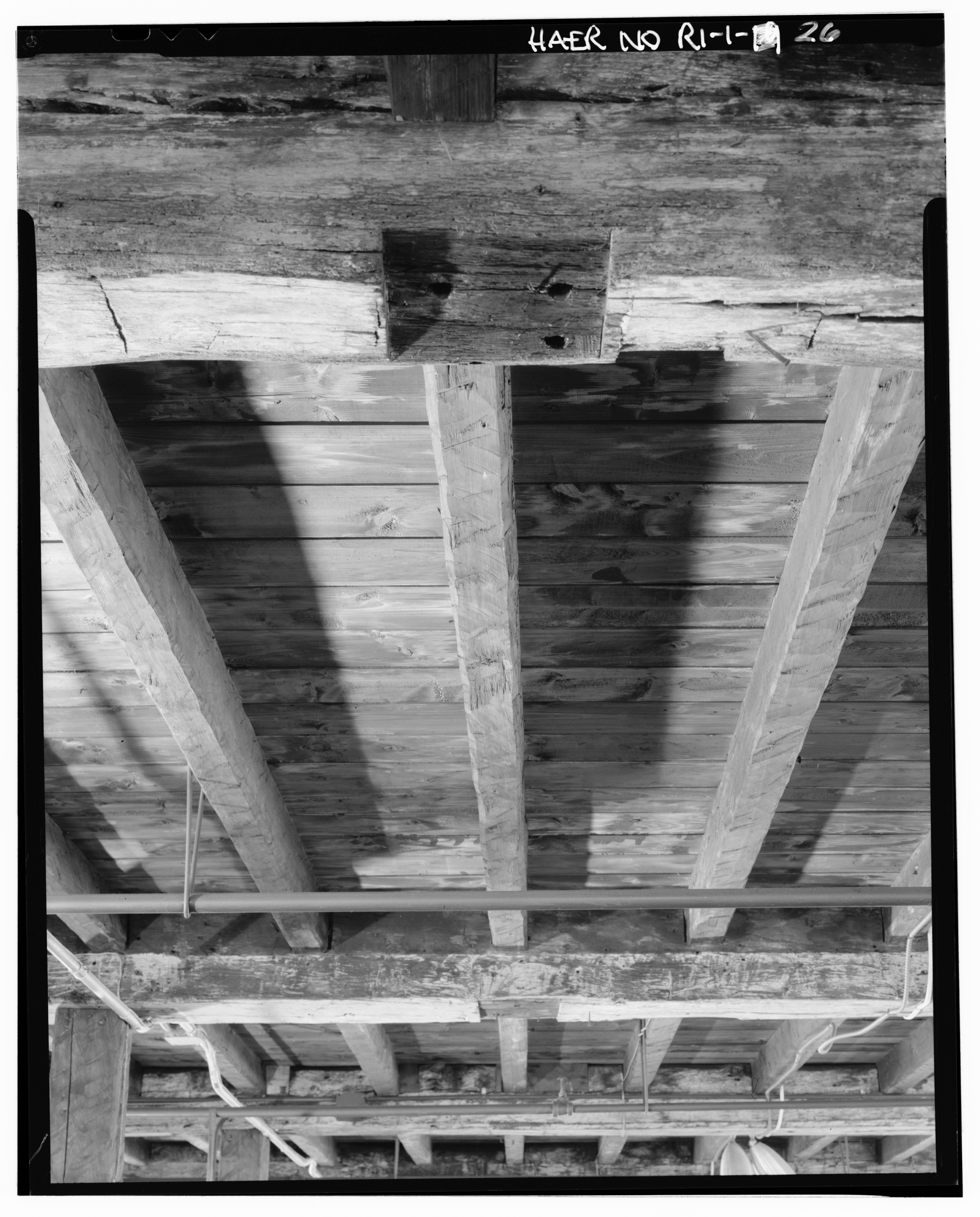
Historic plank floor joists, Slater Mill, Rhode Island, US

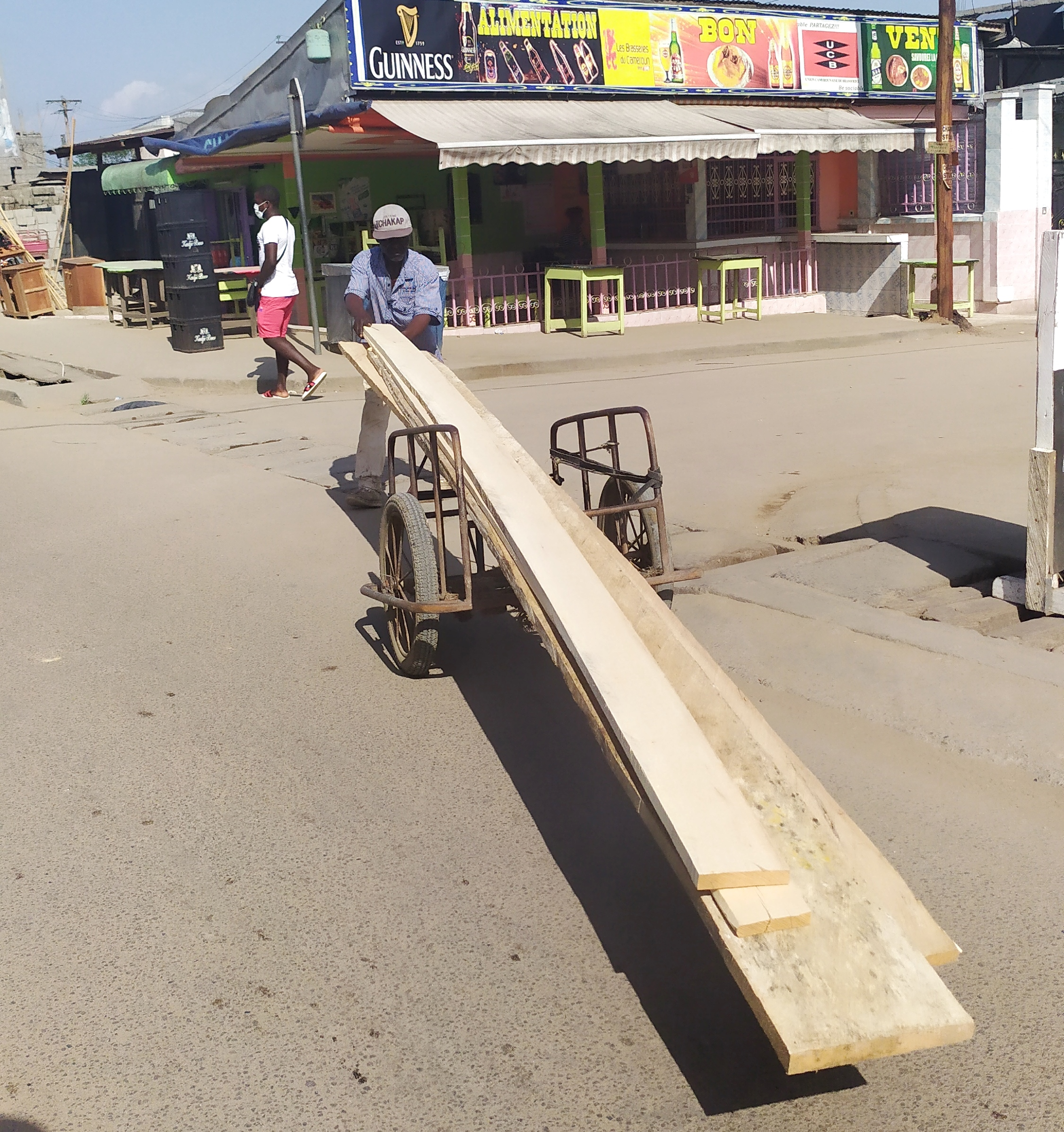
Transport of planks with a hand cart in Douala, Cameroon

== See also ==
- Lumber
- Plank cooking
- Walking the plank
