= Antique Breadboard Museum =

Small museum in Putney, London

Coordinates: 51.4637369°N 0.220621°W

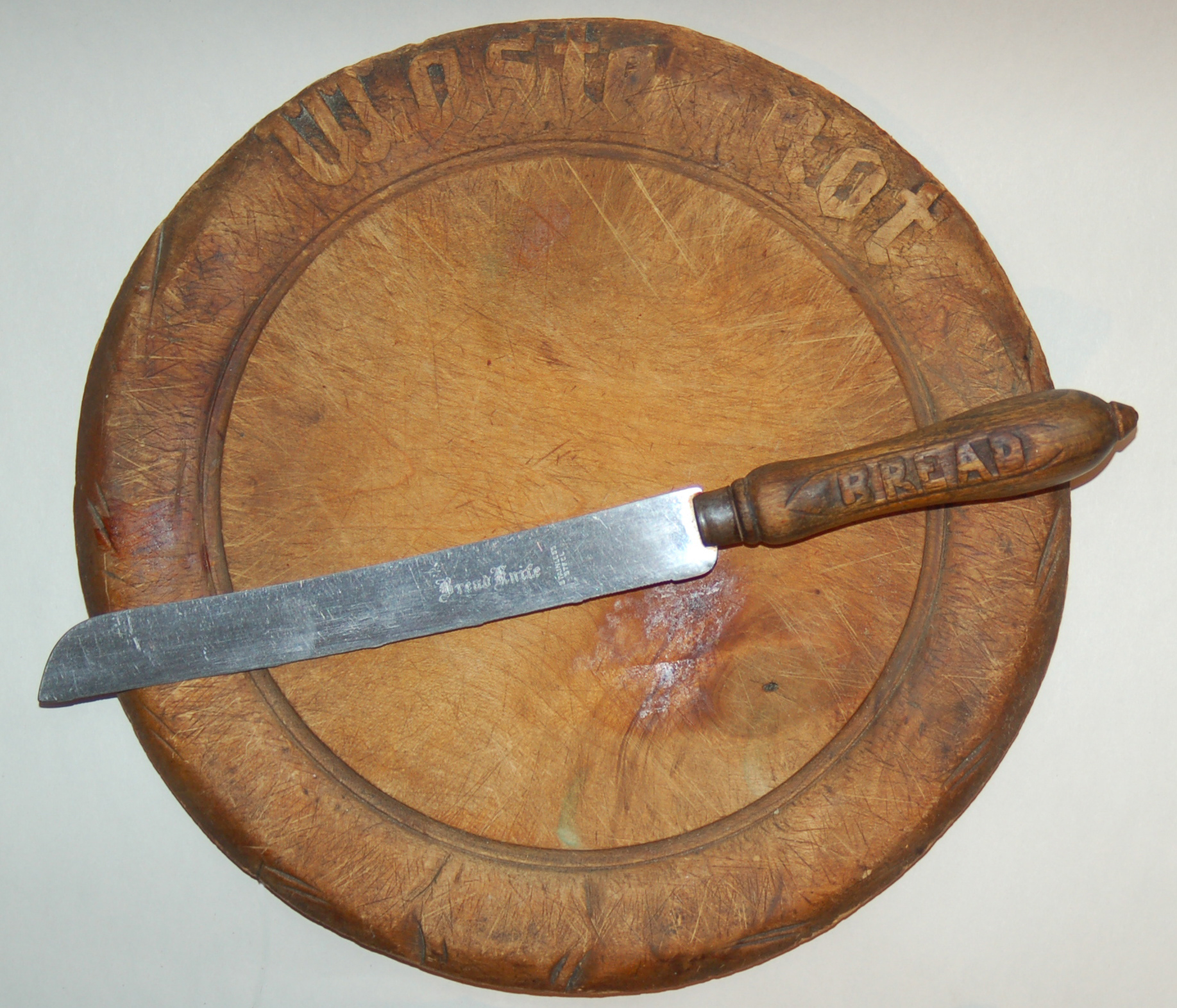
A 19th century breadboard for illustration (not from the museum.)

The Antique Breadboard Museum is a small museum in Putney, London, England, dedicated to breadboards (bread cutting boards).

== History ==
The breadboard collection was amassed by antique dealer Rosslyn Neave, after she died in 2017 her daughter Madeleine Neave opened the museum.

== Building ==
The museum is in an early terraced Victorian cottage in Putney, within the Charlwood road and Lifford street conservation area.

== Collection ==
There are over 400 breadboards in the collection, which date from 1848 to the 1990s. There are also bread knives, butter knives and butter dishes in the collection. The earliest dateable breadboard in the collection dates from 1848 and is by woodcarver William Gibbs Rogers (1792 - 1875).

== Education and research ==
Madeleine Neave wrote the book Vintage Breadboards about the collection, with recipes for breads and cakes contributed by Marie Lester (Instagram: marielesterbaker). The book was published by Prospect Books in Barnes in 2019.

== Access ==
Visits to the museum are by appointment, and are a personal tour from the museum owner for limited size groups, as only four can fit around the collection table at one time.

== Transport ==
The museum is a 5-minute walk from Putney High Street, which is served by Transport for London buses 14, 22, 220, 337, 37 and 39. Putney railway station (Southwestern Railway) is an 8-minute walk from the museum. The Santander Cycles Putney Rail Station docking station is a 10-minute walk from the museum.
