= Plantation teak =

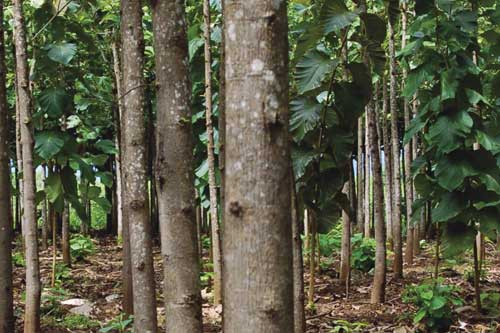
Teak tree plantation

Plantation teak is a tropical hardwood tree from the genus Tectona, endemic to Southeast Asia that is exclusively planted for the purpose of forestry management, for either commercial timber plantations or ecological restoration. Although the genus Tectona is native to the tropical regions of Southeast Asia, primarily Indonesia, Myanmar, India, Bangladesh and Thailand, the cultivation of plantation teak is economically viable in other tropical regions such as Central America.

== Renewable cultivation and harvesting ==
Due to its durability, natural water-resistant qualities and striking wood grain, teak has historically been used in the manufacture of outdoor furniture, boat decks, and other carpentry goods which are to be exposed to the elements for long periods of time. Due to the high demand for this timber and the reasonably short growth period of teak trees, sustainable teak production is currently underway on plantations across many dry tropical climates across Costa Rica and Mexico.

Given the proper conditions, teak can be grown without artificial fertilizers or irrigation; this is thought to give plantation teak the look and durability of old-growth teak from Southeast Asia. Plantation teak is considered a renewable resource, as it is harvested and managed to produce a sustainable supply.

Plantation timber also offers the benefit of reduced shipping costs and emissions. Since teak can be grown throughout the world's dry-tropical zones, plantations offer a geographically closer source of teak. The Forest Stewardship Council has granted certification to a number of sustainable teak plantations in Latin America.

== Conflict teak ==
The destruction of Asia's old-growth teak forests along with the known human rights violations in the region have led some to refer to Asiatic teak as "conflict teak." In 1962, the democratic republic called the Union of Burma was overthrown by a military coup and replaced by a military junta, infamous for human rights abuses and used to put down protests. In 1989, the Burmese government changed the country's name to Myanmar, though teak coming from that nation is typically still referred to as "Burmese teak."

== Plantation versus old growth ==
There exists a common myth that plantation teak exhibits lower densities than timber grown in old-growth forests. However, studies from the United States Forest Service USDA and the Forest Research Institute at Dehra Dun, India found no significant relationship between the growth rate of plantation teak and its density.

However, to match the wood grain of Burmese teak, some forestry experts recommend a process called slow growth cultivation. By finding regions that closely mimic the precipitation and soil characteristics of Burma, plantation teak may be cultivated without irrigation or fertilizers. Thus, the growth rate is similar to that of Burmese teak, and teak plantations can produce timber that is nearly identical to Asian teak.
