= Indirect grilling =

Culinary technique

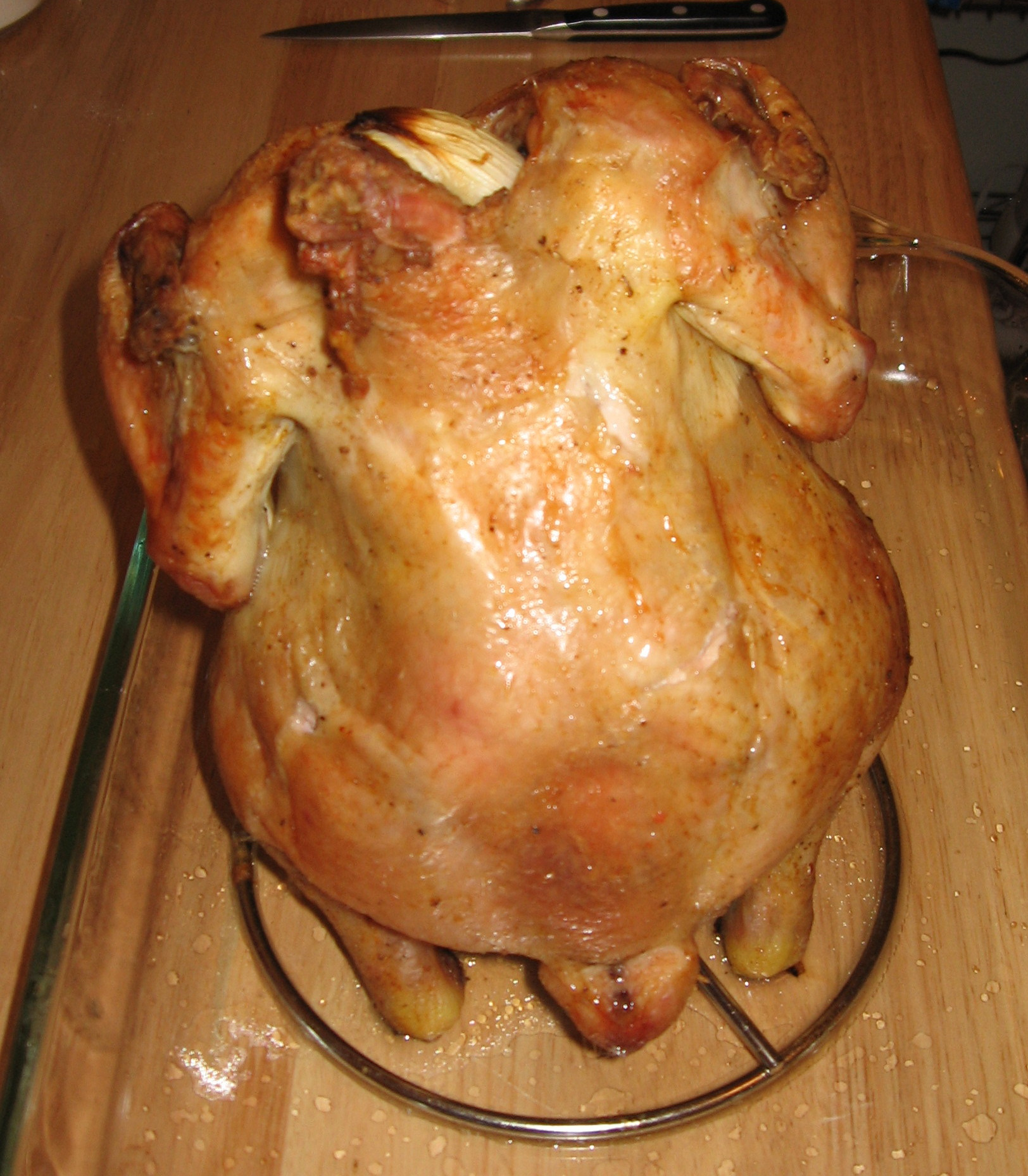
Beer can chicken cooked by indirect grilling

Indirect grilling is a barbecue cooking technique in which the food is placed to the side of or above the heat source instead of directly over the flame as is more common. This can be achieved by igniting only some burners on a gas barbecue or by piling coals to one side of a charcoal pit. A drip tray is placed below the food to prevent fat from the food igniting and generating a direct flame. Indirect grilling is designed to cook larger (e.g. pork shoulders, whole chicken) or tougher foods (e.g. brisket, ribs) that would burn if cooked using a direct flame. This method of cooking generates a more moderate temperature (about 275–350 °F or 135–177 °C) and allows for an easier introduction of wood smoke for flavoring.

While placing the food to one side of the fire places the food further from the heat source and thus reduces the intensity of the radiation, the food is still exposed to direct radiation from the fire. Other variations of indirect grilling place a physical barrier between the food and the fire. One method is to place a plank or an unperforated tray on the grill as a base upon which to cook. If the plank is made from wood and is soaked before grilling, the wood can then be used to impart flavor to the food. Another method of indirect grilling is to place a physical barrier such as a pizza stone between the fire and the food. The heat rises from the fire around the edges of the barrier and then circulates around the food. Most brands of kamado style outdoor cookers have accessories known as heat deflectors which can be placed above the fire and below the food grate.

In the 1990s it became popular to stand a chicken on an open can of beer or other canned beverage inserted into the cavity when indirect grilling, a preparation known as "beer can chicken". Though some believe that the contents of the can boil and flavor the food with the consequent vapor, rigorous tests have invoked skepticism on this point.

== Plank cooking ==
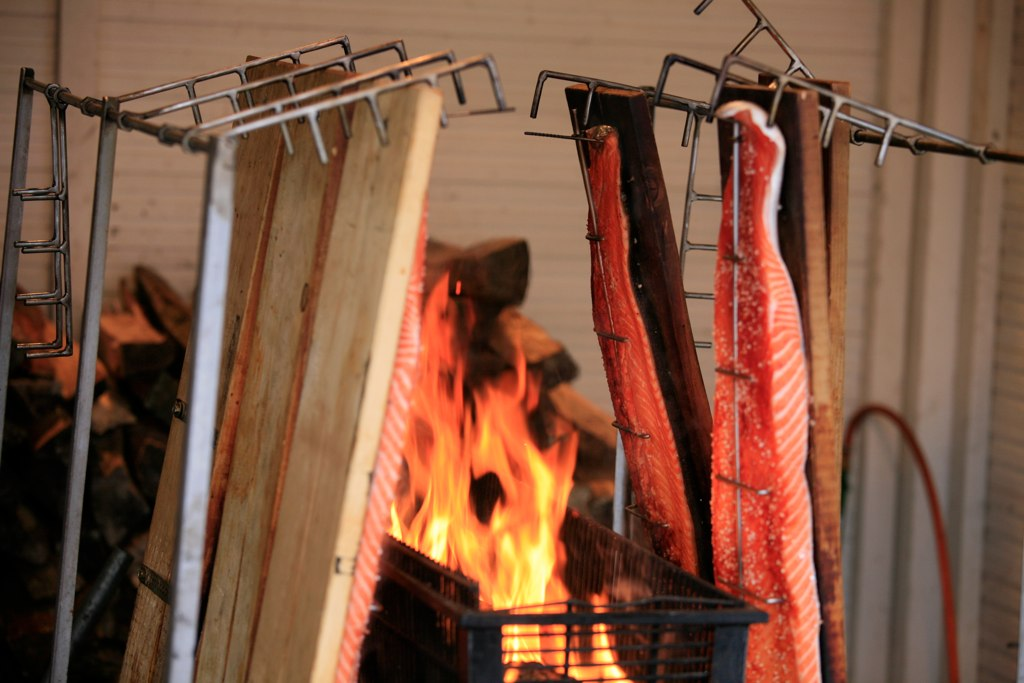
One method of plank cooking salmon steaks

Plank cooking, also referred to as planking, is the technique of roasting or baking food, usually fish or meat, on wooden planks. Several cultures around the world did this in their pre-modern traditional cuisine. The Finnish dish loimulohi ("blazing salmon") is an example of this, while in North America the Northwest Coast Indians used predominantly Western Red Cedar planks to cook Pacific species of salmon.

Planks can be put directly over open flames, or stood on edge and faced towards the flames (the Finnish method), either method infuses the food with the natural oils and moisture found in the woods adding flavor.

Since the 1990s professional chefs in North America have experimented with expanding the list of foods prepared on planks beyond salmon and wild meats, to also include a variety of meats, poultry, vegetables, cheese, fruits and even pizza. For years, restaurants have kept the tradition alive by serving salmon cooked on planks. But more recently, as pre-cut boards have become widely available, chefs and home cooks across the continent have been experimenting with cooking on planks.

Besides roasting over an open flame, planking can also be used in an oven, for breads and pastries as well as savoury dishes.

== See also ==
- Smoking (cooking)
