= Meathead Goldwyn =

American writer

- Born: Craig Goldwyn; June 4, 1949 (age 77); Chicago, Illinois, U.S.
- Education: University of Florida; School of the Art Institute of Chicago (MFA)
- Occupations: publisher, writer, photographer, chef
- Spouse(s): Mary L. Tortorello, PhD
- Children: none
- Culinary career
- Cooking style: Barbecue, Grilling, Outdoor Cooking
- Website: amazingribs.com

Meathead Goldwyn (born June 4, 1949) is an American food writer, chef, and website publisher, whose writing focuses on barbecue, grilling, and smoking. He is the author of the New York Times best-seller Meathead: The Science of Great Barbecue and Grilling. He is also a former columnist for the Chicago Tribune, the Washington Post, and AOL.

== Early life and education ==
Goldwyn derives his moniker from his father, who jokingly labeled him after the character "Meathead" played by Rob Reiner in the 1970s television show All in the Family. Goldwyn's father, who owned a butcher shop and worked as an inspector for the United States Department of Agriculture, also inspired his interest in meats. Goldwyn originally studied journalism and photography at the University of Florida but left in his senior year and moved to Detroit and then Chicago. He later earned a Master of Fine Arts from the School of the Art Institute of Chicago.

== Career ==
Goldwyn began working as a wine buyer in the 1970s. He wrote a wine column for the Chicago Tribune from 1978 to 1981, then for the Washington Post from 1982 to 1985. He later established the food and wine coverage in the early years of AOL. He founded the Beverage Testing Institute, which created the World Wine Championships, World Beer Championships, and World Spirits Championships in the 1980s. He has also taught at Cornell University School of Hotel Administration.

Goldwyn founded AmazingRibs.com in 2005 as a response to a rib cook-off challenge from one of his neighbors. He uses the site to teach cooking methods and recipes, debunk barbecuing myths, and test various equipment. Goldwyn runs the website from his home in suburban Chicago. AmazingRibs.com has been archived by the U.S. Library of Congress Food and Foodways Web Archive along with about 50 other culinary websites.

Goldwyn is the author of the 2016 cookbook Meathead: The Science of Great Barbecue and Grilling,. The cookbook was a New York Times Best Seller and was named one of the “100 Best Cookbooks Of All Time” by Southern Living magazine.

In 2021, Goldwyn was elected as the 40th member of the Barbecue Hall of Fame.
