= 2-Methylanthraquinone =

Names
- Preferred IUPAC name 2-Methylanthracene-9,10-dione
- Other names: β-Methylanthraquinone; Tectoquinone

Identifiers
CAS Number	84-54-8
3D model (JSmol)	Interactive image
Beilstein Reference	2050523
ChEBI	CHEBI:9427
ChEMBL	ChEMBL21745
ChemSpider	6515
ECHA InfoCard	100.001.399
EC Number	201-539-6
Gmelin Reference	1607902
KEGG	C10405
PubChem CID	6773
UNII	Q9P233HWAJ
CompTox Dashboard (EPA)	DTXSID5041439
- InChI: InChI=1S/C15H10O2/c1-9-6-7-12-13(8-9)15(17)11-5-3-2-4-10(11)14(12)16/h2-8H,1H3 Key: NJWGQARXZDRHCD-UHFFFAOYSA-N
- SMILES: Cc1ccc2c(c1)C(=O)c3ccccc3C2=O

Properties
Chemical formula	C_{15}H_{10}O_{2}
Molar mass	222.243 g·mol^{−1}
Appearance	almost colorless
Density	1.365 g/cm3
Melting point	177 °C (351 °F; 450 K)

Hazards
- GHS labelling
Pictograms	(GHS07: Exclamation mark) (GHS09: Environmental hazard)
Signal word	Warning
Hazard statements	H317, H410
Precautionary statements	P261, P272, P273, P280, P302+P352, P321, P333+P313, P363, P391, P501
- Except where otherwise noted, data are given for materials in their standard state (at 25 °C [77 °F], 100 kPa). Infobox references

2-Methylanthraquinone, also known as β-methylanthraquinone and tectoquinone, is an organic compound which is a methylated derivative of anthraquinone. An off-white solid, it is an important precursor to many dyes. It is present in the wood of the teak tree, where it gives the tree resistance to insects.

== Synthesis and reactions ==
The compound is produced by a double electrophilic aromatic substitution reaction of toluene with phthalic anhydride.

It can be chlorinated to give 1-chloro-2-methylanthraquinone. Nitration gives 1-nitro-2-methylanthraquinone, which can be reduced to 1-amino-2-methyl derivative. Oxidation of the methyl group gives anthraquinone-2-carboxylic acid.
