= Agroforestry =

Land use management system

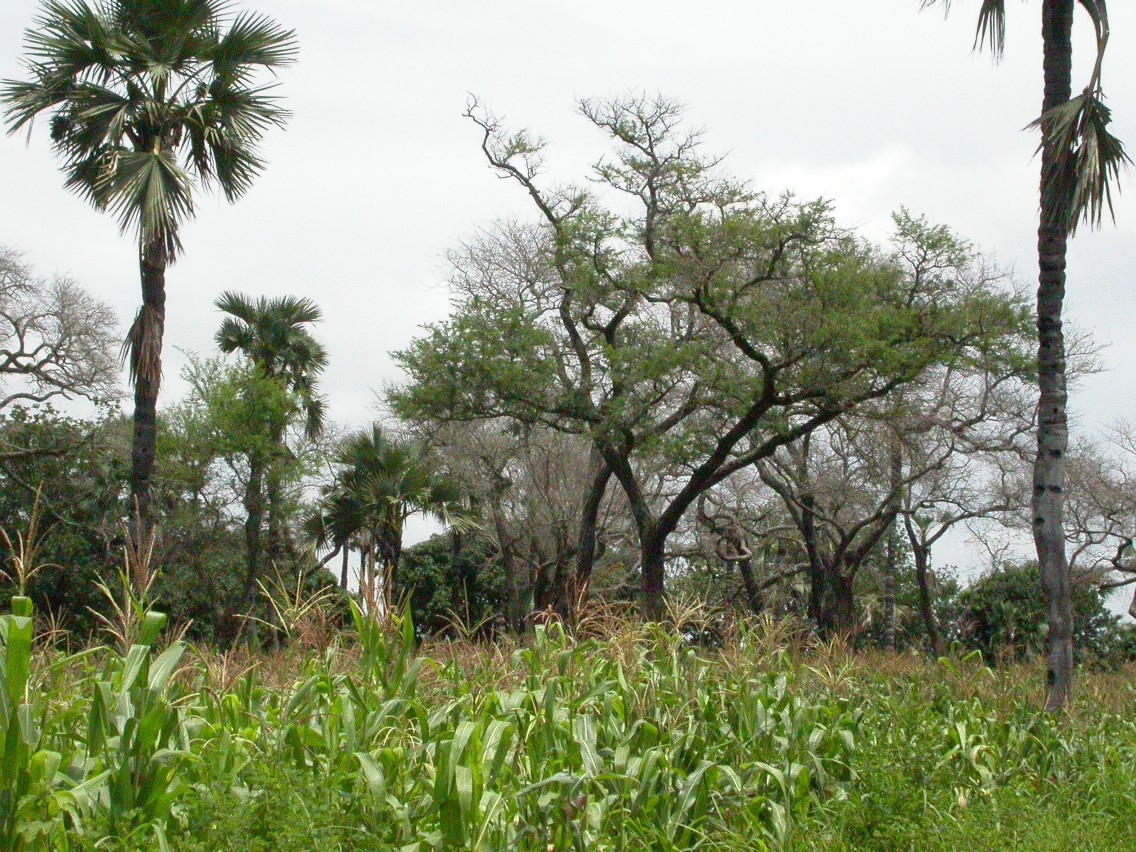
Maize grown under Faidherbia albida and Borassus akeassii near Banfora, Burkina Faso

Agroforestry (also known as agro-sylviculture or forest farming) is a land use management system that integrates trees with crops or pasture. It combines agricultural and forestry technologies. As a polyculture system, an agroforestry system can produce timber and wood products, fruits, nuts, other edible plant products, edible mushrooms, medicinal plants, ornamental plants, animals and animal products, and other products from both domesticated and wild species.

Agroforestry can be practiced for economic, environmental, and social benefits, and can be part of sustainable agriculture. Apart from production, benefits from agroforestry include improved farm productivity, healthier environments, reduction of risk for farmers, beauty and aesthetics, increased farm profits, reduced soil erosion, creating wildlife habitat, less pollution, managing animal waste, increased biodiversity, improved soil structure, and carbon sequestration.

Agroforestry practices are especially prevalent in the tropics, especially in subsistence smallholdings areas, with particular importance in sub-Saharan Africa. Due to its multiple benefits, for instance in nutrient cycle benefits and potential for mitigating droughts, it has been adopted in the US and Europe.

== Definition ==
At its most basic, agroforestry is any of various polyculture systems that intentionally integrate trees with crops or pasture on the same land. An agroforestry system is intensively managed to optimize helpful interactions between the plants and animals included, and "uses the forest as a model of practices". The integration of tree species into farming systems initiates the development of an agroecological succession akin to natural vegetation. Hence, agroforestry is applied agroecology.

Agroforestry shares principles with polyculture practices such as intercropping, but can also involve much more complex multi-strata agroforests containing hundreds of species. Agroforestry can also utilise nitrogen-fixing plants such as legumes to restore soil nitrogen fertility. Many farmers practicing agroforestry do not identify their land use as "agroforestry", signaling a need for greater education and awareness to increase adoption of these sustainable practices.

== History and scientific study ==
The term "agroforestry" was coined in 1973 by Canadian forester John Bene, but the concept includes agricultural practices that have existed for millennia. Scientific agroforestry began in the 20th century with ethnobotanical studies carried out by anthropologists. However, indigenous communities that have lived in close relationships with forest ecosystems have practiced agroforestry informally for centuries. For example, Indigenous peoples of California periodically burned oak and other habitats to maintain a 'pyrodiversity collecting model,' which allowed for improved tree health and habitat conditions. Likewise Native Americans in the eastern United States extensively altered their environment and managed land as a "mosaic" of woodland areas, orchards, and forest gardens.

Agroforestry in the tropics is ancient and widespread, notably in the form of "tropical home gardens." Some of those plots have been continuously cultivated for centuries. A "home garden" in Central America could contain 25 different species of trees and food crops on just one-tenth of an acre. "Tropical home gardens" are traditional systems developed over time by growers without formalized research or institutional support, and are characterized by a high complexity and diversity of useful plants, with a canopy of tree and palm species that produce food, fuel, and shade, a mid-story of shrubs for fruit or spices, and an understory of root vegetables, medicinal herbs, beans, ornamental plants, and other non-woody crops.

In 1929, J. Russel Smith published Tree Crops: A Permanent Agriculture, in which he argued that American agriculture should be changed two ways: by using non-arable land for tree agriculture, and by using tree-produced crops to replace the grain inputs in the diets of livestock. Smith wrote that the honey locust tree, a legume that produced pods that could be used as nutritious livestock feed, had great potential as a crop. The book's subtitle later led to the coining of the term permaculture.

The most studied agroforestry practices involve a simple interaction between two components, such as simple configurations of hedges or trees integrated with a single crop. There is significant variation in agroforestry systems and the benefits they have. Agroforestry as understood by modern science is derived from traditional indigenous and local practices, developed by living in close association with ecosystems for many generations.

Ninety-one countries and areas reported a total land area subject to agroforestry of 55.4 million hectares in 2025. The majority (39.3 million ha) of this area is in Asia, mostly South and Southeast Asia, with India and Indonesia accounting for almost 100% of the regional total and for 70% of the global total.

== Benefits ==
Benefits include increasing farm productivity and profitability, reduced soil erosion, creating wildlife habitat, managing animal waste, increased biodiversity, improved soil structure, and carbon sequestration.

Agroforestry systems can provide advantages over conventional agricultural and forest production methods. They can offer increased productivity; social, economic and environmental benefits, as well as greater diversity in the ecological goods and services provided. These benefits are conditional on good farm management. This includes choosing the right trees, as well as pruning them regularly etc.

=== Biodiversity ===
Agroforestry supports biodiversity in different ways. It provides a more diverse habitat than a conventional agricultural system in which the tree component creates ecological niches for a wide range of organisms both above and below ground. The life cycles and food chains associated with this diversification initiate an agroecological succession that creates functional agroecosystems that confer sustainability. Tropical bat and bird diversity, for instance, can be comparable to the diversity in natural forests. Although agroforestry systems do not provide as many floristic species as forests and do not show the same canopy height, they do provide food and nesting possibilities. A further contribution to biodiversity is that the germplasm of sensitive species can be preserved. As agroforests have no natural clear areas, habitats are more uniform. Furthermore, agroforests can serve as corridors between habitats. Agroforestry can help conserve biodiversity, positively influencing other ecosystem services.

=== Soil and plant growth ===
Depleted soil can be protected from soil erosion by groundcover plants such as naturally growing grasses in agroforestry systems. These help to stabilise the soil as they increase cover compared to short-cycle cropping systems. Soil cover is a crucial factor in preventing erosion. Cleaner water through reduced nutrient and soil surface runoff can be a further advantage of agroforestry. Trees can help reduce water runoff by decreasing water flow and evaporation and thereby allowing for increased soil infiltration. Compared to row-cropped fields nutrient uptake can be higher and reduce nutrient loss into streams.

=== Sustainability ===
Agroforestry systems can provide ecosystem services which can contribute to sustainable agriculture in the following ways:

- Diversification of agricultural products, such as fuelwood, medicinal plants, and multiple crops, increases income security
- Increased food security and nutrition by restored soil fertility, crop diversity and resilience to weather shocks for food crops
- Land restoration through reducing soil erosion and regulating water availability
- Possibility of reduced chemicals inputs, e.g. due to improved use of fertilizer, increased resilience against pests, and increased ground cover which reduces weeds

According to the Food and Agriculture Organization's The State of the World's Forests 2020, adopting agroforestry and sustainable production practices, restoring the productivity of degraded agricultural lands, embracing healthier diets and reducing food loss and waste are all actions that urgently need to be scaled up. Agribusinesses must meet their commitments to deforestation-free commodity chains and companies that have not made zero-deforestation commitments should do so.

=== Other environmental goals ===
Carbon sequestration is an important ecosystem service. Agroforestry practices can increase carbon stocks in soil and woody biomass. Trees in agroforestry systems, like in new forests, can recapture some of the carbon that was lost by cutting existing forests. They also provide additional food and products. The rotation age and the use of the resulting products are important factors controlling the amount of carbon sequestered. Agroforests can reduce pressure on primary forests by providing forest products.

=== Adaptation to climate change ===
Agroforestry can significantly contribute to climate change mitigation along with adaptation benefits. A case study in Kenya found that the adoption of agroforestry drove carbon storage and increased livelihoods simultaneously among small-scale farmers. In this case, maintaining the diversity of tree species, especially land use and farm size are important factors.

Poor smallholder farmers have turned to agroforestry as a means to adapt to climate change. A study from the CGIAR research program on Climate Change, Agriculture and Food Security found from a survey of over 700 households in East Africa that at least 50% of those households had begun planting trees in a change from earlier practices. The trees were planted with fruit, tea, coffee, oil, fodder and medicinal products in addition to their usual harvest. Agroforestry was one of the most widespread adaptation strategies, along with the use of improved crop varieties and intercropping.

== Tropical ==
Trees in agroforestry systems can produce wood, fruits, nuts, and other useful products. Agroforestry practices are most prevalent in the tropics, especially in subsistence smallholdings areas such as sub-Saharan Africa.

Research with the leguminous tree Faidherbia albida in Zambia showed maximum maize yields of 4.0 tonnes per hectare using fertilizer and inter-cropped with the trees at densities of 25 to 100 trees per hectare, compared to average maize yields in Zimbabwe of 1.1 tonnes per hectare.

=== Hillside systems ===
A well-studied agroforestry hillside system is the Quesungual Slash and Mulch Agroforestry System in Lempira Department, Honduras. This region was historically used for slash-and-burn subsistence agriculture. Due to heavy seasonal floods, the exposed soil was washed away, leaving infertile barren soil exposed to the dry season. Farmed hillside sites had to be abandoned after a few years and new forest was burned. The UN's FAO helped introduce a system incorporating local knowledge consisting of the following steps:

1. Thin and prune hillside secondary forest, leaving individual beneficial trees, especially nitrogen-fixing trees. They help reduce soil erosion, maintain soil moisture, provide shade and provide an input of nitrogen-rich organic matter in the form of litter.
2. Plant maize in rows. This is a traditional local crop.
3. Harvest from the dried plant and plant beans. The maize stalks provide an ideal structure for the climbing bean plants. Bean is a nitrogen-fixing plant and therefore helps introduce more nitrogen.
4. Pumpkins can be planted during this time. The plant's large leaves and horizontal growth provide additional shade and moisture retention. It does not compete with the beans for sunlight since the latter grow vertically on the stalks.
5. Every few seasons, rotate the crop by grazing cattle, allowing grass to grow and adding soil organic matter and nutrients (manure). The cattle prevent total reforestation by grazing around the trees.
6. Repeat.

=== Kuojtakiloyan ===
The kuojtakiloyan of Mexico is a jungle-landscaped polyculture that grows avocadoes, sweet potatoes, cinnamon, black cherries, cuajiniquil, citrus fruits, gourds, macadamia, mangoes, bananas and sapotes.

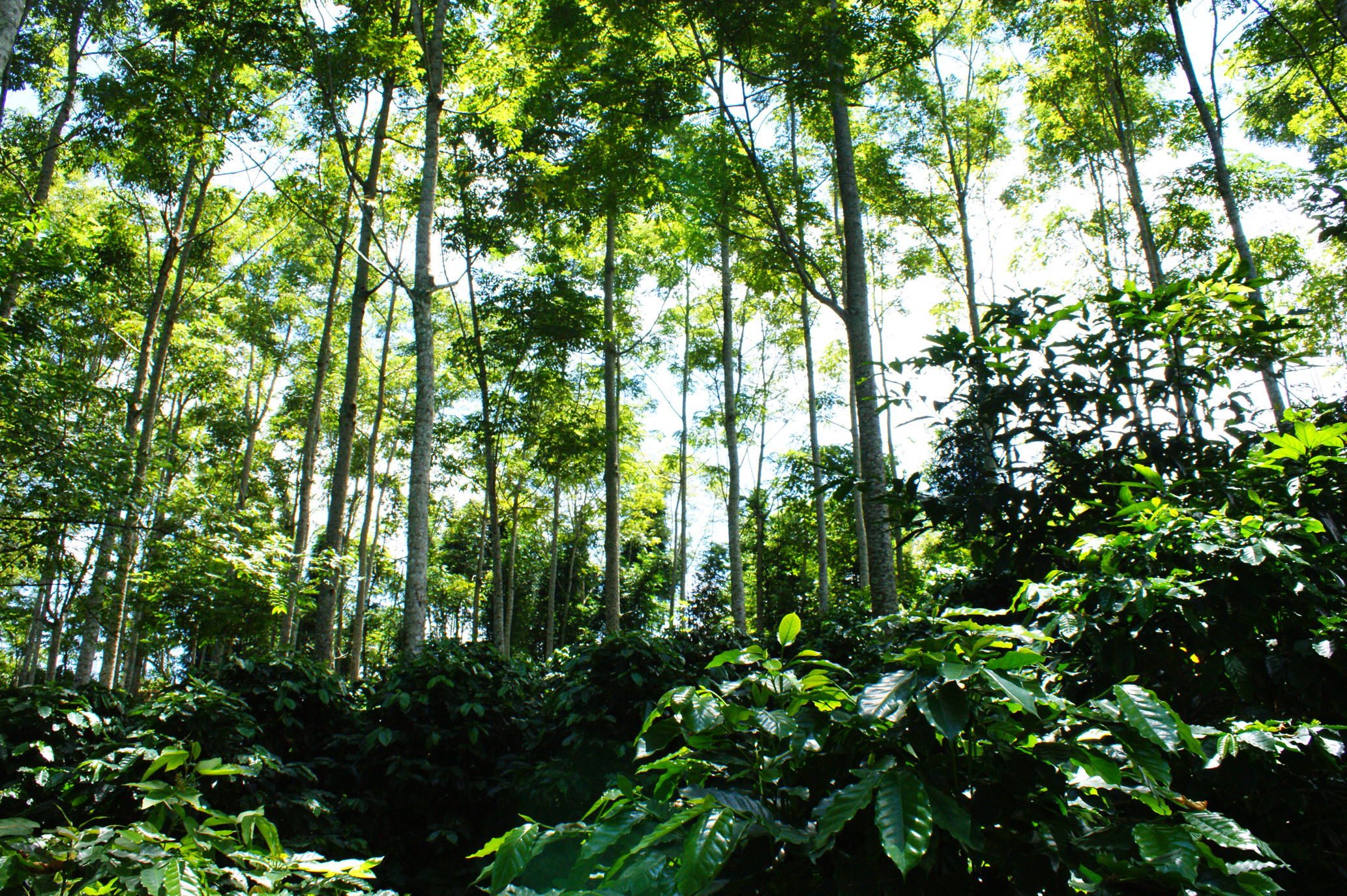
Shade-grown coffee (Coffea arabica) in Sierra Norte of Puebla

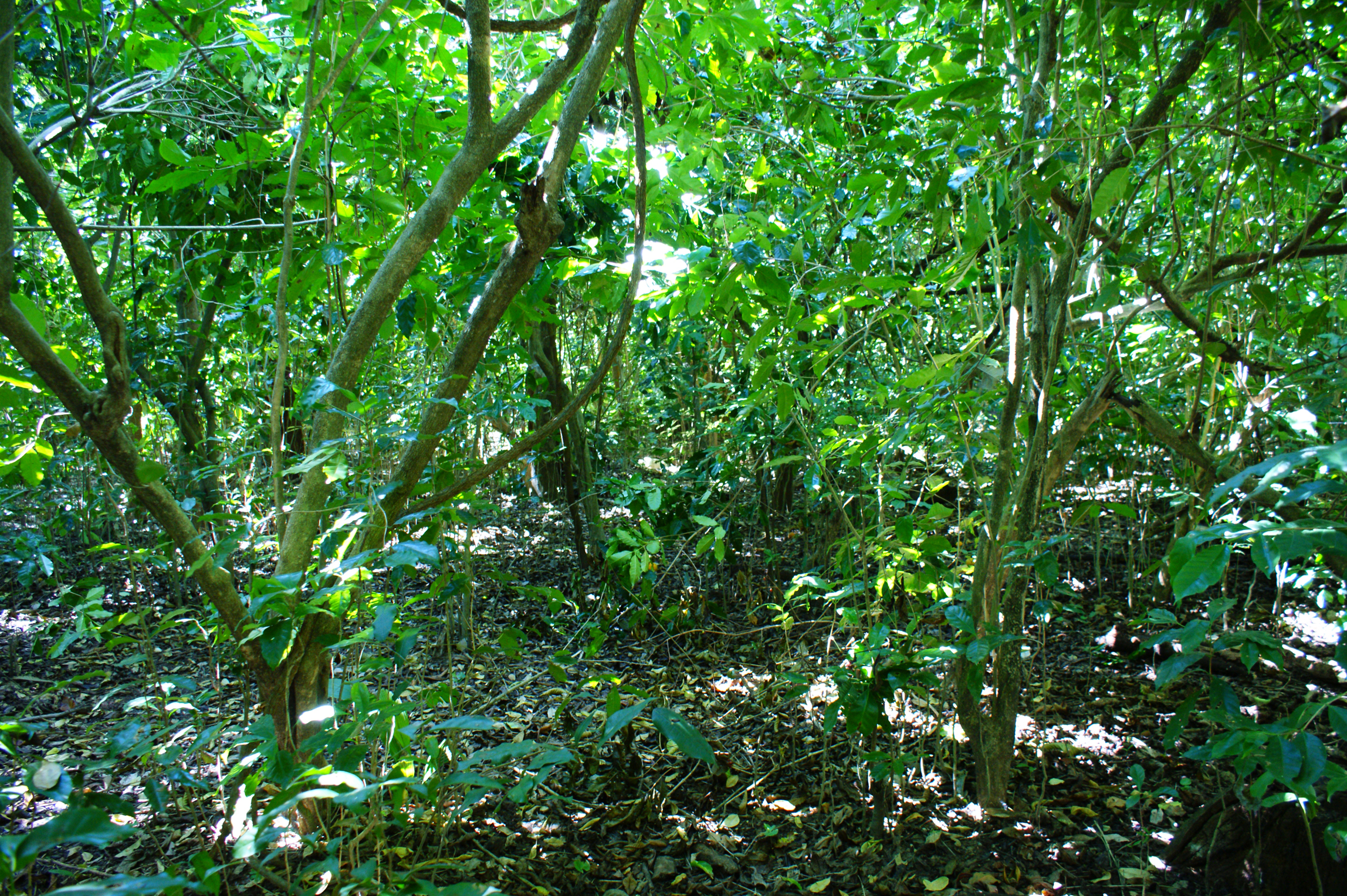
Kuojtakiloyan

Kuojtakiloyan is a Masehual term that means 'useful forest' or 'forest that produces', and it is an agroforestry system developed and maintained by indigenous peoples of the Sierra Norte of the State of Puebla, Mexico. It has become a vital fountain of resources (food, medicinal herbs, fuels, floriculture, etc.) for the local population, but it is also a respectful transformation of the environment, with its biodiversity and nature conservation. The kuojtakiloyan comes directly from the ancestral Nahua and Totonaku knowledge of their natural environment.

The kuojtakiloyan is a jungle-landscaped polyculture in which avocados, sweet potatoes, cinnamon, black cherries, chalahuits, citrus fruits, gourds, macadamia, mangoes, bananas and sapotes are grown. In addition, a wide variety of harvested wild edible mushrooms and herbs (quelites). The jonote is planted because its fiber is useful in basketry, and also bamboo, which is fast growing, to build cabins and other structures. Concurrently to kuojtakiloyan, shade coffee is grown (café bajo sombra in Spanish; kafentaj in Masehual). Shade is essential to obtain high quality coffee. The local population has favored the proliferation of the stingless bee (pisilnekemej) by including the plants that it pollinates. From bees, they get honey, pollen, wax and propolis.

=== Shade crops ===
With shade applications, crops are purposely raised under tree canopies within the shady environment. The understory crops are shade tolerant or the overstory trees have fairly open canopies. A conspicuous example is shade-grown coffee. This practice reduces weeding costs and improves coffee quality and taste. In Sumatra, agroforestry systems mixing robusta coffee with durian and papaya serve as vital buffers for protected areas such as the Gunung Leuser National Park.

=== Alley cropping ===
With alley cropping, crop strips alternate with rows of closely spaced tree or hedge species. Normally, the trees are pruned before planting the crop. The cut leafy material - for example, from Alchornea cordifolia and Acioa barteri - is spread over the crop area to provide nutrients. The hedges serve as windbreaks and reduce erosion. In tropical areas of North and South America, various species of Inga such as I. edulis and I. oerstediana have been used for alley cropping. Weed control is inherent to the practice, providing mulch and shade.

=== Syntropic systems ===
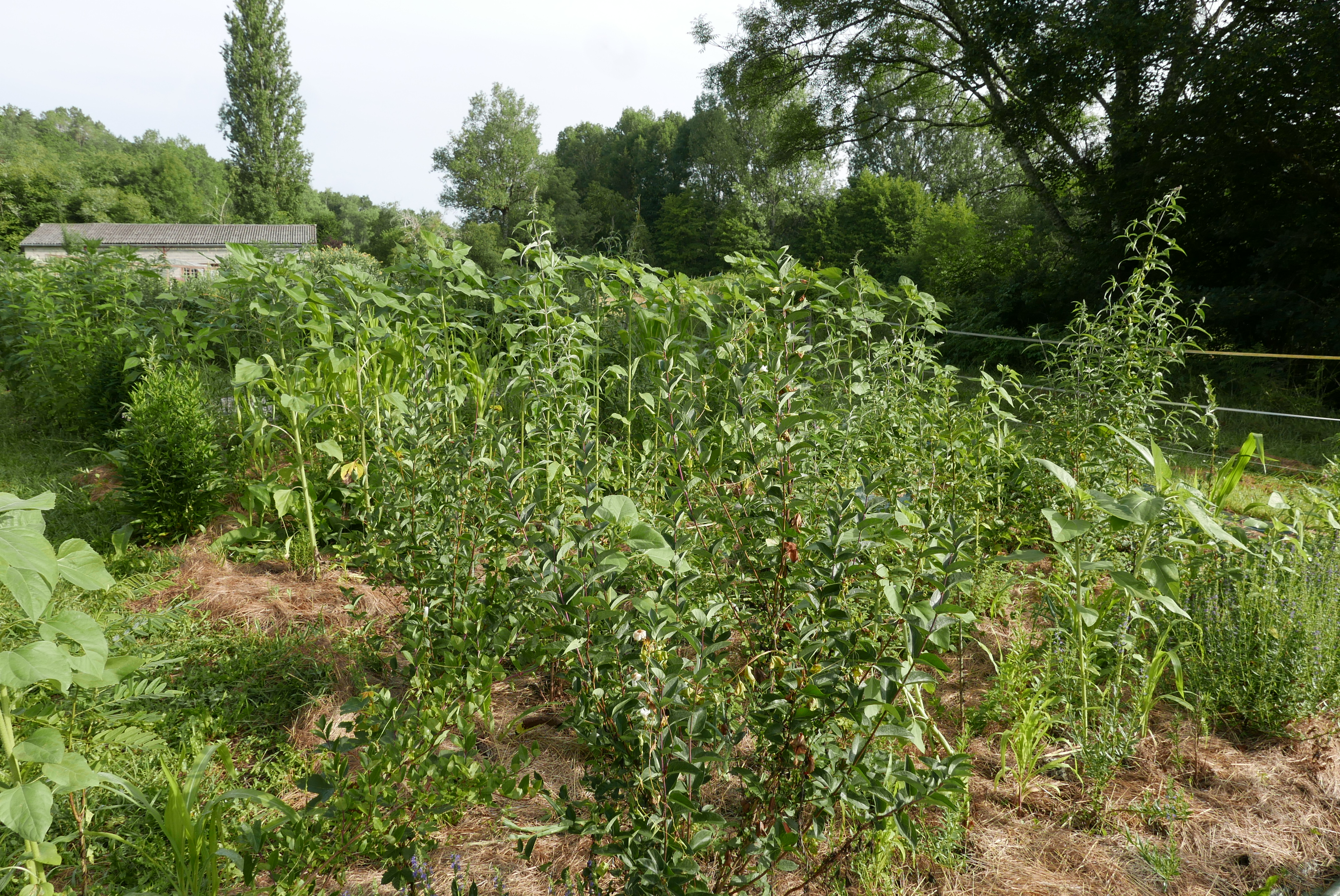
A temperate syntropic system in Dordogne France, including heavily mulched sunflower plants

Syntropic farming, syntropic agriculture or syntropic agroforestry is an organic, permaculture agroforestry system developed by Ernst Götsch in Brazil. Sometimes systems of this type are called successional agroforestry systems or SAFS, a broader concept originating in Latin America. The system focuses on replicating natural systems of accumulation of nutrients in ecosystems, replicating secondary succession, in order to create productive forest ecosystems that produce food, ecosystem services and other forest products.

The system relies on several processes:

- Dense planting mixing perennial and annual crops
- Rapid cutting and composting of fast growing pioneer species, to accumulate nutrients and biomass
- Creating greater water retention on the land through improving penetration of water into soil and plant water cycling

The systems were first developed in tropical Brazil, but many similar systems have been tested in temperate environments as soil and ecosystem restoration tactics.

Syntropic systems have documented benefits including increased soil water penetration, increases to productivity on marginal land and soil temperature moderation.

== Temperate ==
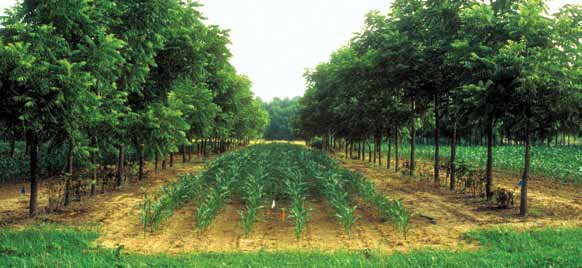
Alley cropping corn fields between rows of walnut trees

Although originally a concept in tropical agronomy, agroforestry's multiple benefits, for instance in nutrient cycles and potential for mitigating droughts, have led to its adoption in the US and Europe.

The United States Department of Agriculture distinguishes five applications of agroforestry for temperate climates, namely alley cropping, forest farming, riparian forest buffers, silvopasture, and windbreaks.

=== Alley cropping ===
Alley cropping can also be used in temperate climates. Strip cropping is similar to alley cropping in that trees alternate with crops. The difference is that, with alley cropping, the trees are in single rows. With strip cropping, the trees or shrubs are planted in wide strips. The purpose can be, as with alley cropping, to provide nutrients, in leaf form, to the crop. With strip cropping, the trees can have a purely productive role, providing fruits, nuts, etc. while, at the same time, protecting nearby crops from soil erosion and harmful winds.

=== Forest farming ===
In forest farming, high-value crops are grown under a suitably-managed tree canopy. This is sometimes called multi-story cropping, or in tropical villages as home gardening. It can be practised at varying levels of intensity but always involves some degree of management; this distinguishes it from simple harvesting of wild plants from the forest.

=== Riparian forest buffers ===
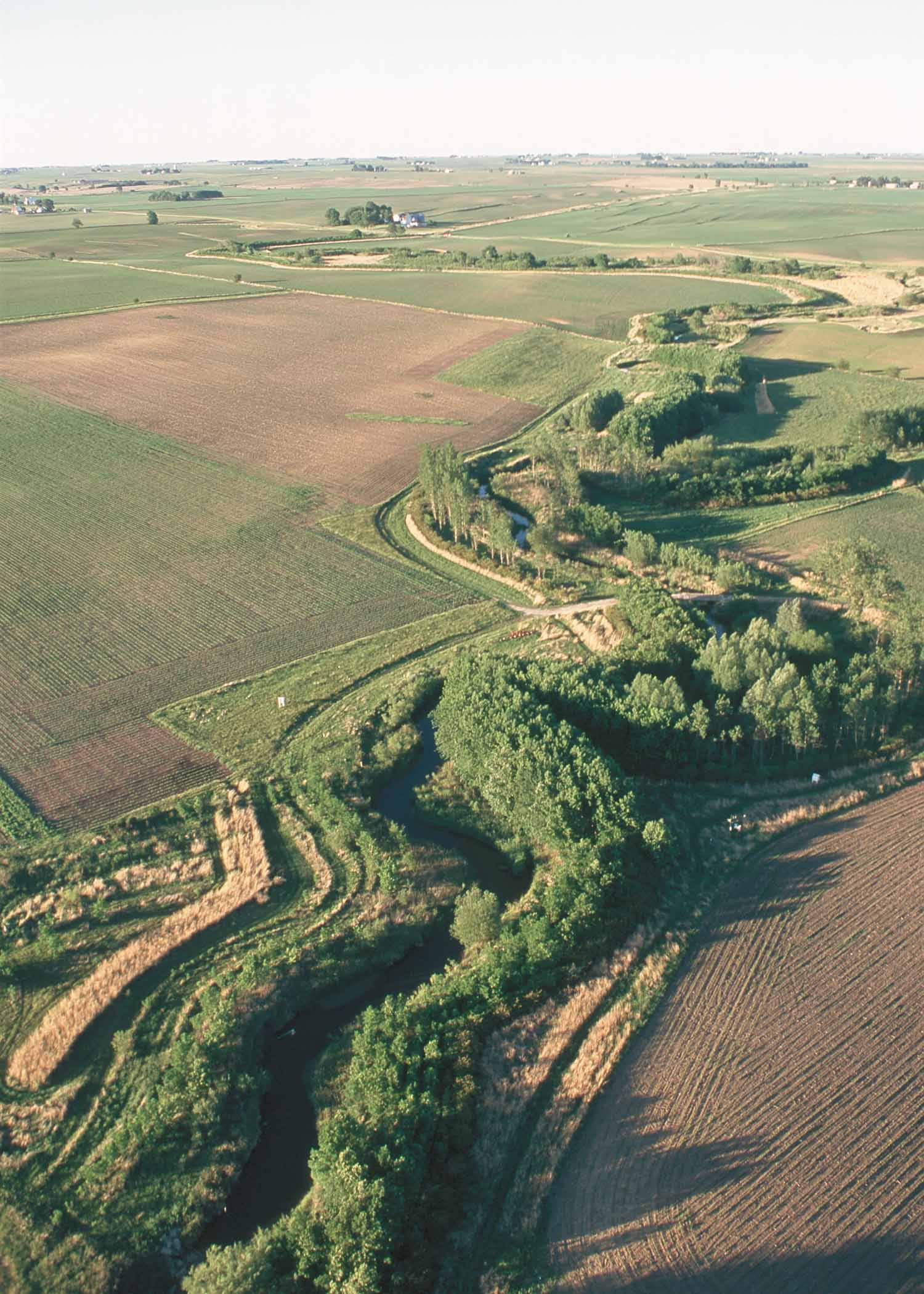
A riparian buffer bordering a river in Iowa

Riparian buffers are strips of permanent vegetation located along or near active watercourses or in ditches where water runoff concentrates. The purpose is to keep nutrients and soil from contaminating the water.

=== Silvopasture ===
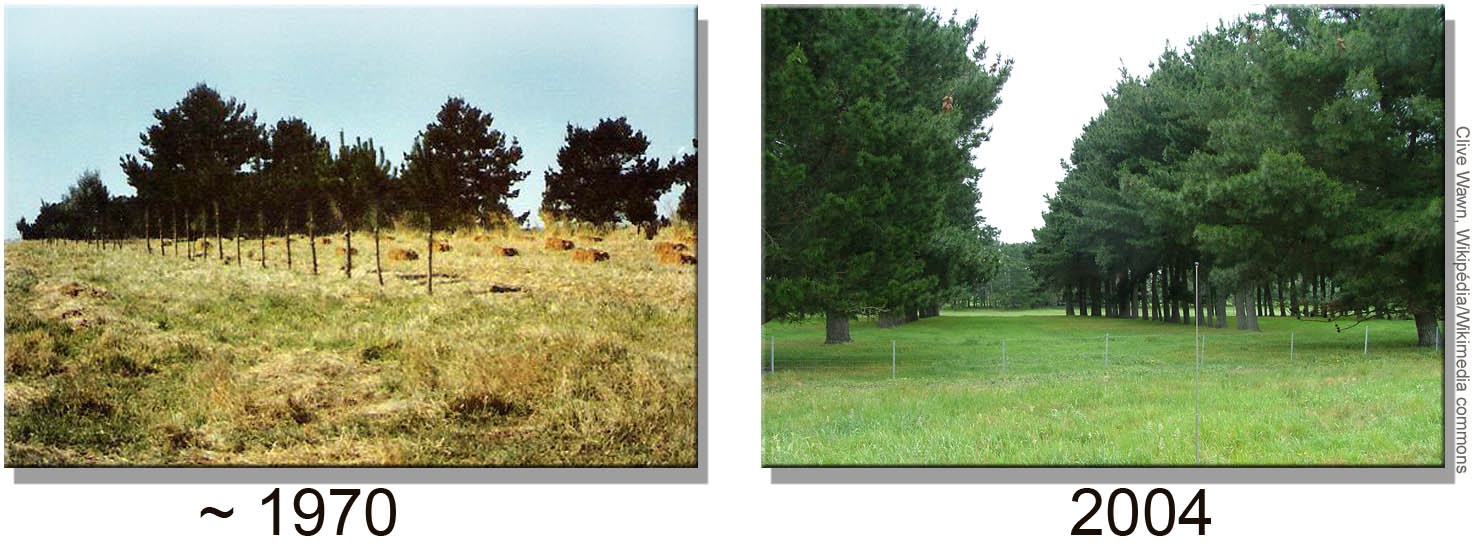
Silvopasture over the years (Australia)

Trees can benefit fauna in a silvopasture system, where cattle, goats, or sheep browse on grasses grown under trees.

The dehesa or montado system of silviculture are an example of pigs and bulls being held extensively in Spain and Portugal.

=== Windbreaks ===
Windbreaks reduce wind velocity over and around crops. This increases yields through reduced drying of the crop and/or by preventing the crop from toppling in strong wind gusts.

== Urban ==
Urban agroforestry is the application of agroforestry principles in urban and suburban environments, where reduced ecological functioning is common. It involves the deliberate integration of trees with shrubs and crops, which together ultimately produce an agricultural product, into managed landscapes such as residential backyards, public parks, and streetscapes.

=== Benefits ===
The UN state that the implementation of urban agroforestry systems offer a range of ecosystem services that can improve the health and resilience of urban areas. These benefits include improving environmental resilience, biodiversity, and social and cultural wellbeing.

==== Environmental resilience ====
The integration of agroforestry systems into rooftop gardens improves insulation of buildings reducing the demand of energy for cooling by up to 20%. Moreover, agroforestry systems increase permeable surfaces that alleviate urban drainage systems and enhance stormwater management. Finally, agroforestry systems improve air quality by absorbing pollutants like nitrogen dioxide, ozone and particulate matter, as well as releasing oxygen as quantified by several studies.

==== Biodiversity ====
The incorporation of a vast variety of trees, shrubs, and crops creates heterogeneous habitats for various species such as pollinators, birds and small mammals leading to an increase in biodiversity. In addition, through an enhanced connectivity between habitats the persistent problem of habitat fragmentation in urban areas is alleviated. However, the current evidence base remains limited, with studies focusing mostly on the improvement of avian diversity. Overall, the literature supports a context-dependent benefit of agroforestry systems for biodiversity, while indicating the need for further research across a broader range of taxonomic groups, focussing more on urban and suburban areas.

==== Social and cultural wellbeing ====
Integrating food-producing trees and plants into urban landscapes enhances local self-sufficiency by increasing access to fresh, locally grown products. Still, as reported by the UN the actual and potential capacity for food production of urban agroforestry systems is often underestimated. Beyond the provision of food, these systems create green recreational spaces that support mental health, lower stress and improve community well-being.

=== Implementation barriers and trade-offs ===
The implementation of urban agroforestry comes with a set of challenges unique to the urban setting. These barriers are often closely associated with economic (opportunity) costs and biophysical challenges.

==== Financial costs ====
Costs include expenditures for constructing and maintaining urban agroforestry spaces. These costs cover plants, equipment, and soil preparation, as well as administrative personnel and labor for pruning, weeding, pest control, and harvesting. Maintenance also includes irrigation and access to electricity, which may require permits or connection costs. These upfront investments are often substantial, while the resulting ecological and social benefits only emerge after three to ten years, depending on the species.

Besides direct financial costs, urban agroforestry can indirectly cause damages. Trees can negatively affect nearby gray infrastructure, as they can lift pavement and obstruct drainage systems, ultimately resulting in additional financial costs. Even after successful implementation, challenges such as vandalism and damage from urban pests create additional barriers for urban agroforestry practices.

==== Biophysical challenges ====
Urban environments pose biophysical challenges, including higher temperatures, which can increase heat and drought stress on trees. Urban soils are frequently compacted and can be contaminated, limiting root development and tree health. The resulting contamination can raise food safety concerns and limit the recognition of urban agriculture as a food-producing practice. Additionally, pollen can cause allergic reactions and thus negatively impact health.

==== Opportunity costs ====
As urban land is valuable, opportunity costs resulting from competition among different land uses can put significant constraint on the implementation due to limited land access.

=== Examples/Projects ===
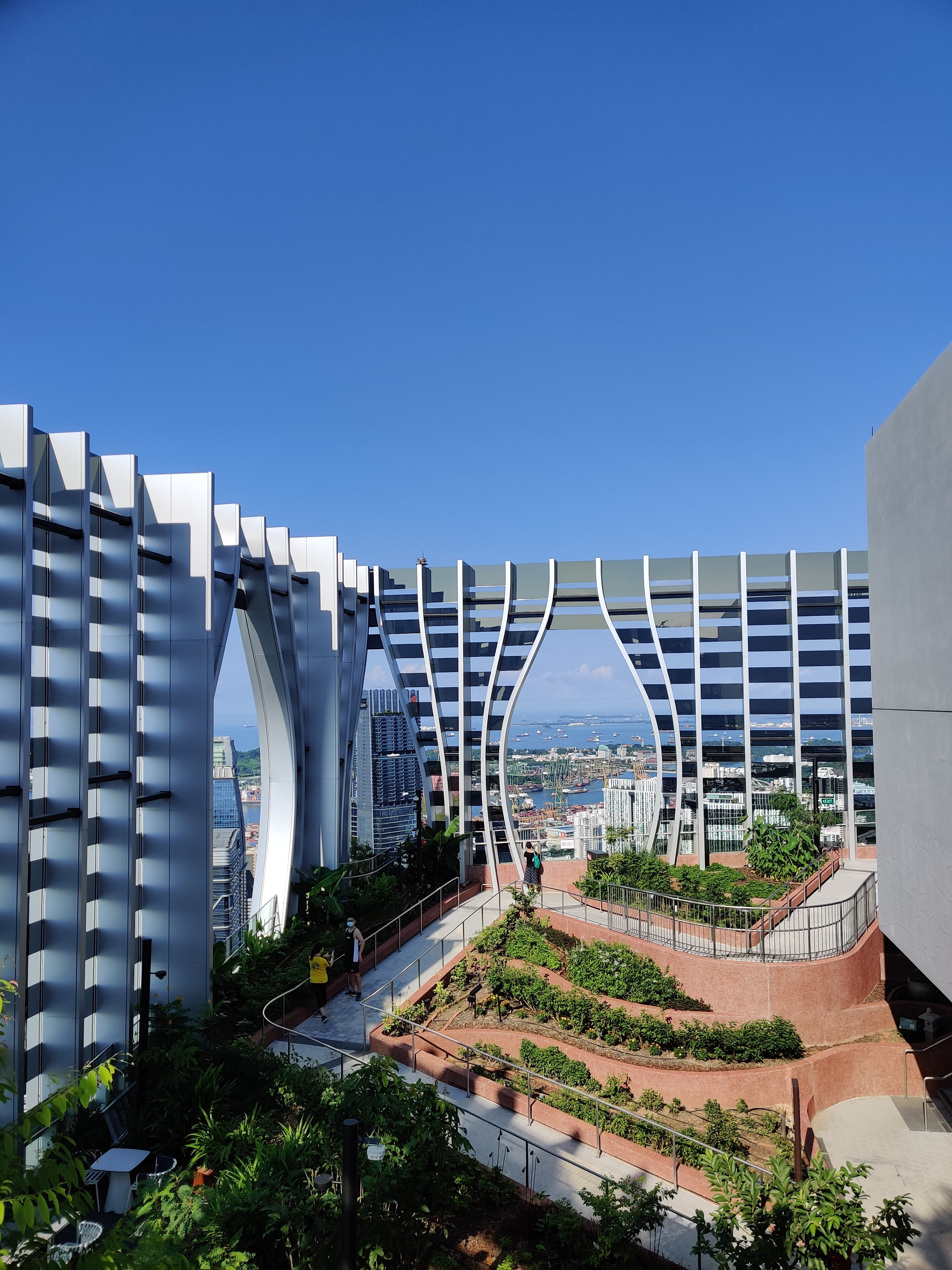
The food forest atop CapitaSpring in Singapore

Urban food forests are a form of urban agroforestry that mimic the natural forest ecosystem. The practice combines trees with food production and can be implemented within cities and on rooftops. Some examples of this practice can be found in Singapore where roof gardens are utilised for urban agroforestry.

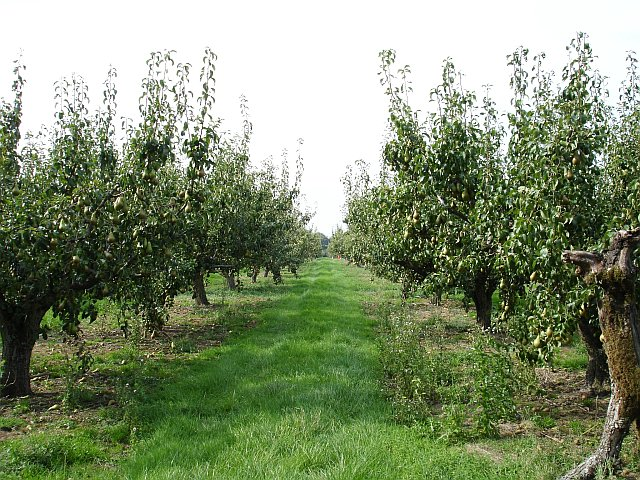
A pear orchard near Faversham

Community orchards (a prominent form of community gardens) represent further examples of urban agroforestry, as fruit and/or nut trees are planted (often in linear patterns) and managed by a community.

A city farm becomes a form of urban agroforestry when it intentionally integrates trees and perennial crops with other agricultural components in the urban landscape, thus creating a multifunctional system that produces food while also supporting ecological and community benefits.

== Forest gardening ==
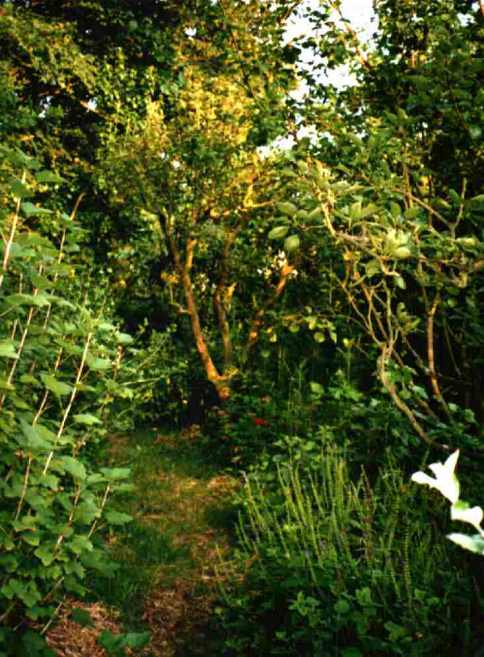
Robert Hart's forest garden in Shropshire.

Forest gardening is a low-maintenance, sustainable, plant-based food production and agroforestry system based on woodland ecosystems, incorporating fruit and nut trees, shrubs, herbs, vines and perennial vegetables which have yields directly useful to humans. Making use of companion planting, these can be intermixed to grow in a succession of layers to build a woodland habitat.

Forest gardening is a prehistoric method of securing food in tropical areas. In the 1980s, Robert Hart coined the term "forest gardening" after adapting the principles and applying them to temperate climates. Forest gardens, or home gardens, are common in the tropics, using intercropping to cultivate trees, crops, and livestock on the same land. In Kerala in south India as well as in northeastern India, the home garden is the most common form of land use and is also found in Indonesia. One example combines coconut, black pepper, cocoa and pineapple. These gardens exemplify polyculture, and conserve much crop genetic diversity and heirloom plants that are not found in monocultures. Forest gardens have been loosely compared to the religious concept of the Garden of Eden.

=== History ===
Forest gardens are probably the world's oldest form of land use and most resilient agroecosystem. First Nation villages in Alaska with forest gardens filled with nuts, stone fruit, berries, and herbs, were noted by an archeologist from the Smithsonian in the 1930s.

Forest gardens are still common in the tropics and known as Kandyan forest gardens in Sri Lanka; huertos familiares, family orchards in Mexico; agroforests; or shrub gardens. They have been shown to be a significant source of income and food security for local populations.

Robert Hart adapted forest gardening for the United Kingdom's temperate climate during the 1980s.

=== In temperate climates ===
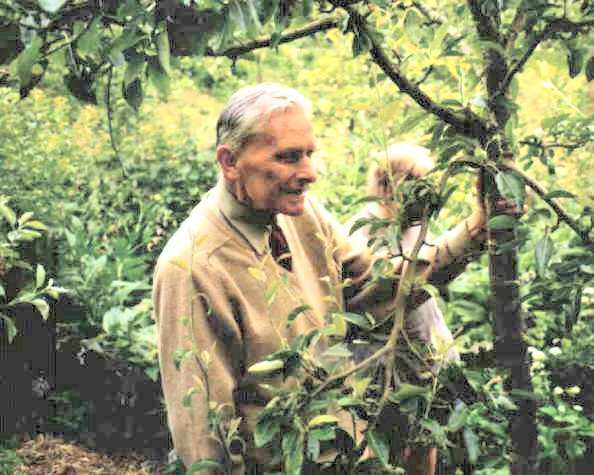
Robert Hart, forest gardening pioneer

Hart began farming at Wenlock Edge in Shropshire to provide a healthy and therapeutic environment for himself and his brother Lacon. Starting as relatively conventional smallholders, Hart soon discovered that maintaining large annual vegetable beds, rearing livestock and taking care of an orchard were tasks beyond their strength. However, a small bed of perennial vegetables and herbs he planted was looking after itself with little intervention.

Following Hart's adoption of a raw vegan diet for health and personal reasons, he replaced his farm animals with plants. The three main products from a forest garden are fruit, nuts and green leafy vegetables. He created a model forest garden from a 0.12 acre (500 m^{2}) orchard on his farm and intended naming his gardening method ecological horticulture or ecocultivation. Hart later dropped these terms once he became aware that agroforestry and forest gardens were already being used to describe similar systems in other parts of the world. He was inspired by the forest farming methods of Toyohiko Kagawa and James Sholto Douglas, and the productivity of the Keralan home gardens; as Hart explained, "From the agroforestry point of view, perhaps the world's most advanced country is the Indian state of Kerala, which boasts no fewer than three and a half million forest gardens ... As an example of the extraordinary intensity of cultivation of some forest gardens, one plot of only 0.12 hectares (0.30 acres) was found by a study group to have twenty-three young coconut palms, twelve cloves, fifty-six bananas, and forty-nine pineapples, with thirty pepper vines trained up its trees. In addition, the smallholder grew fodder for his house-cow."

==== Seven-layer system ====
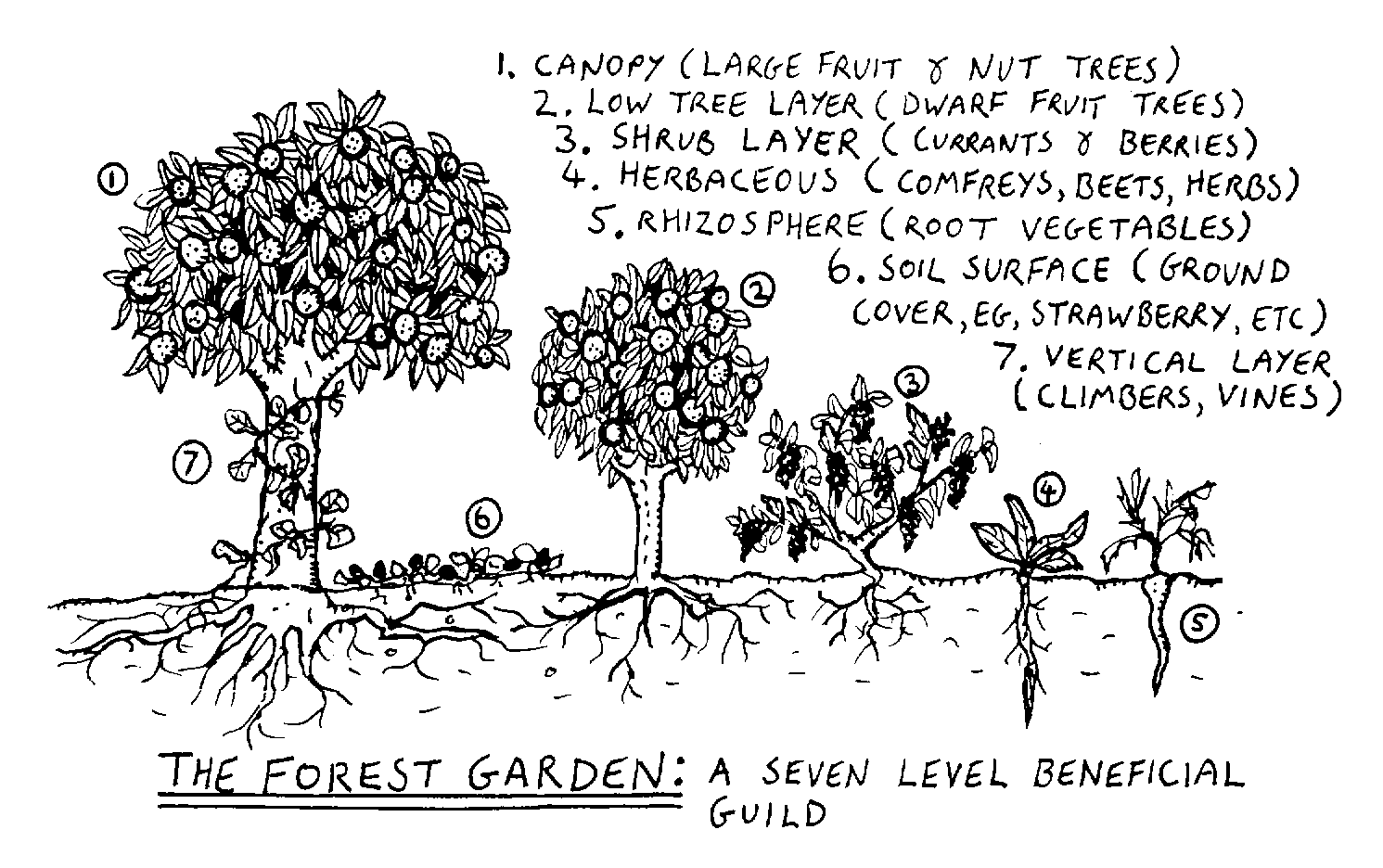
The seven layers of the forest garden

==== Further development ====
The Agroforestry Research Trust, managed by Martin Crawford, runs experimental forest gardening projects on a number of plots in Devon, United Kingdom. Crawford describes a forest garden as a low-maintenance way of sustainably producing food and other household products.

Ken Fern had the idea that for a successful temperate forest garden a wider range of edible shade tolerant plants would need to be used. To this end, Fern created the organisation Plants for a Future which compiled a plant database suitable for such a system. Fern used the term woodland gardening, rather than forest gardening, in his book Plants for a Future.

=== Projects ===
El Pilar on the Belize–Guatemala border features a forest garden to demonstrate traditional Maya agricultural practices. A further one acre model forest garden, called Känan K'aax (meaning 'well-tended garden' in Mayan), is funded by the National Geographic Society and developed at Santa Familia Primary School in Cayo.

In the United States, the largest known food forest on public land is believed to be the seven acre Beacon Food Forest in Seattle, Washington. The Boston Food Forest Coalition promotes local forest gardens.

In Canada, Richard Walker has been developing and maintaining food forests in British Columbia for over 30 years. He developed a three-acre food forest that at maturity provided raw materials for a plant nursery and herbal business as well as food for his family. The Living Centre has developed various forest garden projects in Ontario.

In the United Kingdom, other than those run by the Agroforestry Research Trust (ART), projects include the Bangor Forest Garden in Gwynedd, northwest Wales. Martin Crawford from ART administers the Forest Garden Network, an informal network of people and organisations who are cultivating forest gardens.

Since 2014, Gisela Mir and Mark Biffen have been developing a small-scale edible forest garden in Cardedeu near Barcelona, Spain, for experimentation and demonstration.

== Forest farming ==
Forest farming is the cultivation of high-value specialty crops under a forest canopy that is intentionally modified or maintained to provide shade levels and habitat that favor growth and enhance production levels. Forest farming encompasses a range of cultivated systems from introducing plants into the understory of a timber stand to modifying forest stands to enhance the marketability and sustainable production of existing plants.

Non-timber forest products are plants, parts of plants, fungi, and other biological materials harvested from within and on the edges of natural, manipulated, or disturbed forests. Examples include ginseng, shiitake mushrooms, decorative ferns, and pine straw.

=== History ===
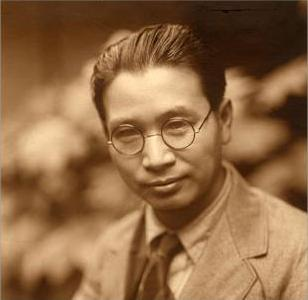
Toyohiko Kagawa, forest farming pioneer

Forest farming has long been practiced around the world, as people have relied on fruits, nuts, seeds, and foliage from trees and shrubs to feed themselves and their livestock.

In 1929, J. Russell Smith, emeritus Professor of Economic Geography at Columbia University, published "Tree Crops – A Permanent Agriculture," which stated that crop-yielding trees could provide useful substitutes for cereals in animal feeding programs, as well as conserve environmental health. Toyohiko Kagawa read and was heavily influenced by Smith's publication and began experimental cultivation under trees in Japan during the 1930s.

Through forest farming, or three-dimensional forestry, Kagawa addressed problems of soil erosion by persuading many of Japan's upland farmers to plant fodder trees to conserve soil, supply food and feed animals. He combined extensive plantings of walnut trees, harvested the nuts and fed them to the pigs, then sold the pigs as a source of income. When the walnut trees matured, they were sold for timber and more trees were planted so that there was a continuous cycle of economic cropping that provided both short-term and long-term income to the small landowner. The success of these trials prompted similar research in other countries. World War II disrupted communication and slowed advances in forest farming. In the mid-1950s research resumed in places such as southern Africa. Kagawa was also an inspiration to Robert Hart, who pioneered forest gardening in temperate climates in the sixties in Shropshire, England.

Livestock was formerly often considered part of the forest farming system. Now animals are typically excluded and agroforestry systems that integrate trees, forages and livestock are referred to as silvopastures. Because forest farming combines the ecological stability of natural forests with productive agriculture systems, it is considered to have great potential for regenerating soils, restoring ground water supplies, controlling floods and droughts, and cultivating marginal lands.

=== Methods ===
Forest farming methods may include thinning of overstocked tree stands; integrated entries to accomplish thinning so that systemic shock is minimized; and interactive management to maintain a cross-section of healthy trees and shrubs of all ages and species. Physical disturbance to the surrounding area should be minimized.

=== Food Forest ===
Food forest is a permaculture practice where it prioritizes the growth of perennial species and various layers of plants to create an edible landscape. It is characterized as a perennial polyculture. The seven layers of a food forest are as follows: Canopy trees, understory trees, shrub layer, herbaceous plants, ground cover plants, vines and root zone (rhizosphere). Food Garden or Food Forest are not confined to a specific geographical region or continent and can be established in various environments. Food Forest are adaptable in various scale but require access to land where plants can be rooted and integrated into the soil, a key process of regenerative agriculture. Food Forests are composed primarily of native perennials crops and require careful design and planning before established in the soil, as they represent long-term agriculture systems, along with a foundational understanding of ecological principles.

==== Indigenous history ====
Indigenous peoples have managed their land for millennia, by applying various agroecology techniques and principles. The Milpa system, is a sustainable horticulture technic used by the Maya, who are the Indigenous people of what is now known as Mexico, Belize, Guatemala, Honduras and El Salvador. This ancient agroecological practice involves intercropping crops such as maize, beans, squash, and chilis. Similarly, The Haudenosaunee, the Indigenous inhabitant that is now known as United States and Canada, used a technic, referred to as the three sisters, which requires three crops: corn, bean and squash. Both of these techniques requires that the crops help each other by providing nutrients to the soil, ground cover, pest control, and stability. For millennia, Indigenous communities, The Chumash, Yurok, Karuk, Hupa and Miwok tribes, in what is now known as California have practiced traditional agroecological methods, including controlled burning, to support ecosystem health and maintain soil fertility.

==== Contemporary context ====
In the 21st century, food forests have made a resurgence to address issues that current industrial agriculture practices possess. Agriculture contributes to nearly 30% of greenhouse gases. Much of the emission is caused by monoculture techniques, where one single crop is grown in a field. With modern concern of food system, climate change and sustainable living, many experts have addressed permaculture as a mitigation tool. Today, many Indigenous communities are reclaiming control over their food systems as a way of decolonization and resilience. In Hawaiʻi, traditional farmers are working to restore lands damaged by agrochemical corporations across the archipelago by revitalizing ancestral food forest systems that sustained their communities for millennia.

== See also ==
- Afforestation
- Agri-environmental measures
- Agroecology
- Agroecological restoration
- Carbon farming
- Climate-friendly gardening
- Christmas tree cultivation
- Dynamic agroforestry
- Farm Forestry Toolbox
- Farmer-managed natural regeneration
- Fertilizer tree
- Forest gardening
- Forest islands
- Land use, land-use change, and forestry
- Landscape of agriculture
- Mycoforestry
- Natural farming
- Orchard
- Pekarangan
- Permaculture
- Plantation forestry
- Polyculture
- Regenerative agriculture
- Shifting cultivation
- Silvopasture
- Sustainable forest management
- Zaï

== Sources ==
This article incorporates text from a free content work. Licensed under CC BY 4.0 (license statement/permission). Text taken from Global Forest Resources Assessment 2025, Food and Agriculture Organization of the United Nations (FAO).
