= River Styles Framework =

The River Styles Framework is a scientific tool used to describe and explain the diversity and distribution of river types in a catchment according to river character and behaviour. The River Styles Framework is based on the science of fluvial geomorphology. Each river type is called a "River Style" and its name is constructed following a consistent naming convention. The River Styles Framework provides an open-ended process for interpreting rivers rather than fitting them into pre-existing categories. The River Styles Framework is designed to provide a scientific basis for river management. It was developed by researchers at Macquarie University.

== History ==
The River Styles Framework was developed by Gary Brierley and Kirstie Fryirs at Macquarie University. The first peer reviewed paper on River Styles was published in 2000. Initial research that helped to develop the River Styles Framework was funded by Land & Water Australia and New South Wales Department of Land and Water Conservation.

== Stages of the River Styles Framework ==
The River Styles Framework has four stages of analysis, which provide a framework to describe river character, explain how the river behaves and predict how a river may adjust its form in the future. The following overview of the stages is sourced from the book,"Geomorphology and River Management: Application of the River Styles Framework".

=== Stage 1 ===
Stage 1 provides a baseline survey of a river's character and behaviour. Steps in Stage 1 include:

1. Analysis of the catchment setting and controls on river morphology
2. Mapping River Styles across the catchment
3. Interpretation of the controls on river character and behaviour and the downstream pattern of River Styles in a catchment.

=== Stage 2 ===
Stage 2 assesses and explains geomorphic river condition throughout a catchment. River condition is a determination of environmental quality pertaining to a river's geomorphology. Steps in Stage 2 include:

1. Determination of a River Style's ability to adjust its geomorphology
2. Assessment of the River Style's evolutionary history in order to identify if a river has changed irreversibly
3. Determination and explanation of the geomorphic condition of the section of river being assessed.

=== Stage 3 ===
Stage 3 determines the potential for a river to 'recover', or improve in condition. Steps in Stage 3 include:

1. Determination of the trajectory of a river's geomorphic adjustment (how it has adjusted in the past and how it might change in the future)
2. Assessment of the potential for a river to recover and assessment of factors limiting recovery.

=== Stage 4 ===
Stage 4 uses information from Stages 1 to 3 to identify 'target conditions' for a River Style as a goal toward which river rehabilitation (or restoration) can work. Steps in Stage 4 include:

1. Identification of target conditions for river rehabilitation and level of intervention required to reach target conditions
2. Prioritisation of river management efforts based on geomorphic river condition and potential for the river to recover
3. Monitoring and auditing of adjustments to geomorphic river condition.

== Applications and uses of the River Styles Framework ==
The River Styles Framework has been used to support river management in Australia, New Zealand, United States and Brazil. In Australia, the Department of Industry (New South Wales) used the River Styles Framework as a key component in developing the River Condition Index (RCI) as a tool to assess river value, risk to river value and to monitor changes in river condition over time. The River Styles Framework also contributes to the method for determining 'High Ecological Value Aquatic Ecosystems' (HEVAE) as part of the Australian National Water Initiative.

In the United States, the River Styles Framework formed part of the protocol for the Columbia Habitat Monitoring Program (CHaMP) developed for the Columbia River Basin. The CHaMP protocol used River Styles to help with comparing river types, predicting fish habitat suitability and prioritising river conservation and rehabilitation activities.

A cost-benefit analysis completed by Land & Water Australia found that the River Styles Framework had a benefit-to-cost ratio of 28:1 and had contributed a net value of $40 million (AUD) in 2010.

== Training and accreditation ==
An accreditation framework has been developed for use of the River Styles Framework to ensure quality control. There are two levels of accreditation: 'Provisional' and 'Accredited'. 'Provisional' practitioners have undertaken a River Styles Short Course and have passed the associated assessment tasks. 'Provisional' practitioners may undertake assessments of River Styles under the supervision of a fully accredited practitioner. Full accreditation is gained following successful completion of a River Styles Short Course and completion of a satisfactory River Styles Report. 'Accredited' practitioners may undertake River Styles assessments unsupervised and may also supervise 'Provisional' practitioners.
