= Farm Forestry Toolbox =

Collection of computer programs

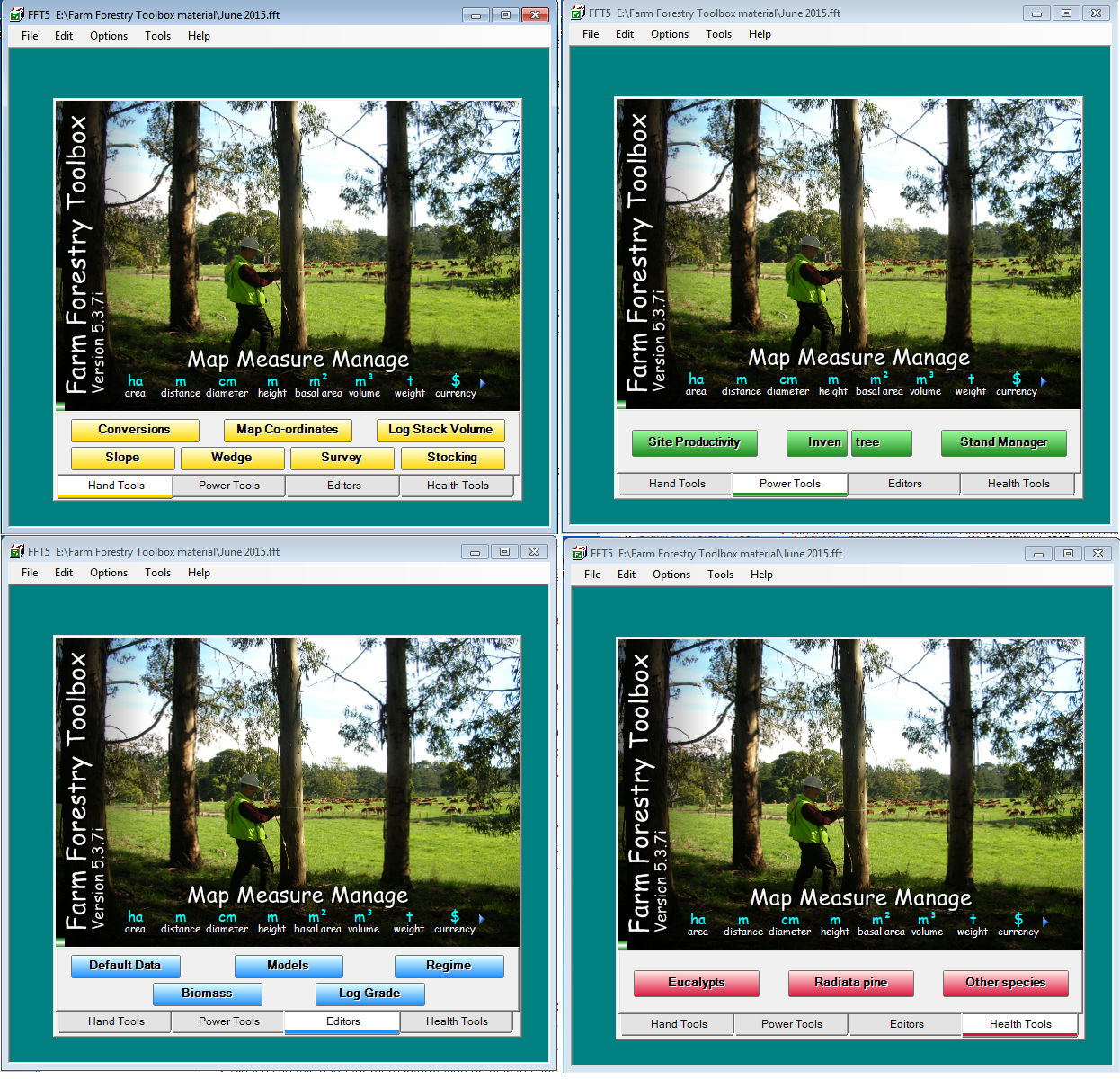
Toolbox photograph

The Farm Forestry Toolbox is a collection of computer programs, referred to as 'Tools', intended to be used by farm forest owners and managers to aid decision making. The Toolbox includes a set of simple 'Hand Tools'; conversion of measurements and map co-ordinates; measuring the volume of stacked logs, slope, basal area; and a survey tool. A second set of more complex tools or 'Power Tools'; can be used to estimate site productivity (growth rate), volume and value of wood grown for individual trees, at the coupe or stand level and forest estate level.

== Background ==
Farm Forestry is a term used in Australia to describe the use of private land to grow wood products and provide a number of other ecosystem services. Private land is land registered under Torrens title and leasehold land, usually leased from the government. Farm Forestry is defined as 'establishment and/or management of trees or forests on agricultural landscapes for commercial, aesthetic and/or environmental reasons. The term 'Farm Forestry', as used in Australia, encompasses Afforestation, Agroforestry, Analog forestry, Buffer strip, Plantation, Reforestation, Riparian-zone restoration, Silvopasture and Windbreak.

Support for Farm Forestry has been provided by both the Australian Government and State governments. In 2005 the Australian government released a Farm Forestry - National Action Statement.

In addition, governments have provided grants, funded research, provided advice (extension) and tax incentives to encourage landowners to adopt Farm Forestry.

== Rationale ==
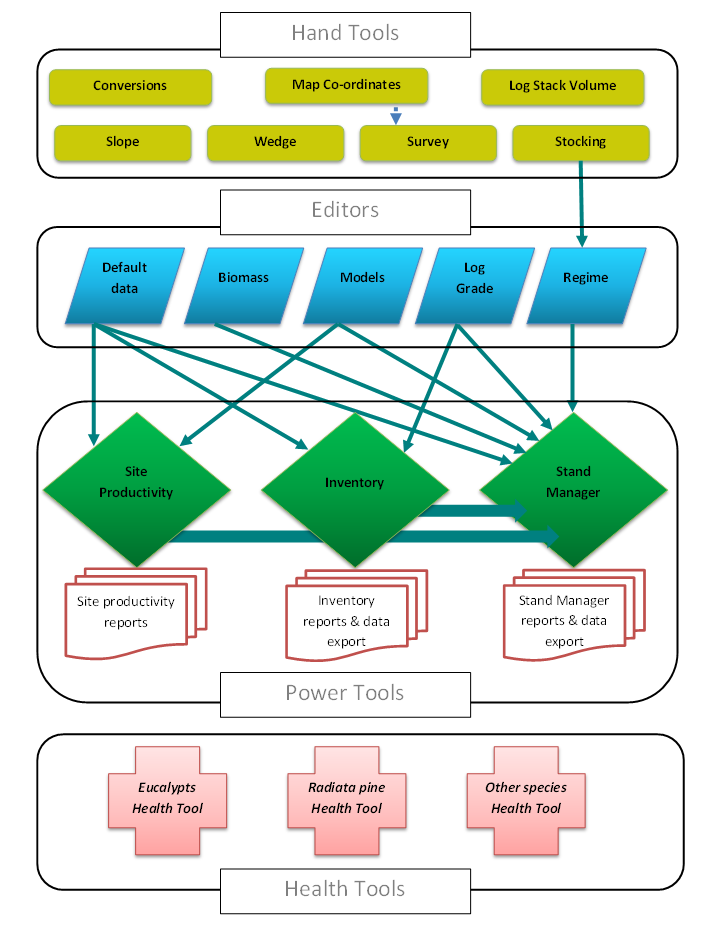
Relationship between Tools in the Farm Forestry Toolbox

The 'Tools' were initially developed to make routine forest management tasks easier. For example, using the 'Stocking Tool' it is possible to calculate the number of trees required, given a row and in-row spacing, and the area to be planted.

The 'Health Tool' has a similar approach. A user can diagnose tree health problems using the Toolbox, replacing the need to use reference texts, or having to enlist the assistance of a forest health expert for the initial diagnosis.

Forest researchers have developed a number growth models, but these models are often difficult to access and use. The Toolbox was developed to ensure that growth models were available to farm forestry owners and managers, able to be used to inform decision making, and provide a link between the growth models outputs and financial modelling tools.

The 'Stand Manager' is more complex and can be used to calculate net present value, internal rate of return, and wood and product yields. This Tool is used to explore management scenarios, and the resultant financial return and wood yield. A user of the 'Stand Manager' is required to create log grade sets (log specifications), regimes (sequence of events over the life of the rotation detailing events, including timing and costs/returns), as input data. This Tool can also use the output from 'Site Productivity' and 'Inventory' tools.

=== Using the Toolbox ===
Users can 'customise' the Toolbox by using the 'Editors' and/or manual input of key data, such as growth rate. This means the Toolbox can be used for any type of planted forest (windbreak or shelterbelt, agroforestry, woodlot, or plantation), and can be used for existing planted forest or an area being considered for planting. Financial management options can be explored by inputting user-defined wood yields where no suitable models are available.

Extensive user support is available for the Toolbox, with Manuals and Workbooks provided. In addition to 'On Screen Help', 'Help' panels are displayed in many Tools. The Toolbox includes in the 'Editors' sample Log Grade sets, Regimes and Biomass sets, that a user can modify.

The 'Video Help' is available on the YouTube channel Farm Forestry Toolbox. However, the updating of this facility was still a work in progress when the Project finished (see Toolbox Project Closure below).

== Toolbox Tools ==
Hand Tools	Description
Conversions	Converts common standard units of measurement including area, length, volume, weight, and slope.
Map-Coordinates	Converts geographic and map grid coordinates on various datums. Works globally.
Log Stack Volume	Estimates volume and weight of an individual log or a stack of logs. Calculates and presents a statistical report for a stack of logs. Output can be saved and printed.
Slope	Calculates vertical, horizontal and slope length using angle units (degrees or percent).
Wedge Calibration	Calibrates angle gauge instruments used to measure basal area.
Survey	Calculates the map area, using bearings and distances, either from a traverse or by GPS. Able to annotate maps and print at different scales and import/export files to GIS. Allows an image (scanned aerial photo or map) to be added to the background of a map. Boundaries can then be over-drawn, and areas and distances estimated.
Stocking	A planting design tool which links to planting event(s) in the Regime editor. Calculates the number of trees per hectare using the distance between trees and between rows and allows grazing bays to be included in the design.

Power Tools	Description
Site Productivity (for Plantations)	Estimates, for selected species, growth over time using Site Quality Index (MDH - mean dominant height & Age) or AGGRO. AGGRO is a physiological model also used in Stand Manager. AGGRO is calibrated for E. globulus, E. nitens, and P. radiata. Site and climate data required. Toolbox provides default climate data for most Australian regions in which commercial plantations can be grown.
Inventory Tool	A tool that allows quality assessments of single trees or plots. Log grades to be specified and value specified by user. Output can be saved and printed. Able to estimate wood volume and log grades in a single tree, a plot of trees or the whole forest. The tool displays information graphically and has import and export data function. Taper models for species from Australia included.
Stand Manager	Uses costs and income (actual or predicted) to calculate returns over a rotation. Allows a user to test management options. Output can be saved and printed. Includes physiological growth model (AGGRO) with parameterisations for Eucalyptus globulus, Eucalyptus nitens, and Pinus radiata. Empirical growth models for species planted in Australia. All scenario runs summarized in the Session Log, and scenario data can be recovered from both the Session Log. Users able to simulate an income stream from carbon credits with Carbon Inventory events.

Other Tools	Description
Default Data Editor	Used to define some system-wide default values.
Log Grade Editor	Used to define log grade specifications. Grades can be defined with preferred length and overcut allowance. Log assorts can be directed to maximise preferred product volumes, or total value.
Regime Editor	Used to construct a sequence of forest operations/events. Regimes for forest used for growing trees, or NPV & IRR used purely for financial analysis without forest growth and harvesting. Adding a Planting event to a 1st rotation automatically adds compulsory Financial Base and Clear-felling events. The Planting event facilitates complex planting designs and area exclusions. The Financial Base event sets the date to which future cost and revenues are discounted, and the interest rate to be used for NPV calculations. Event dates set to the day rather than the year and can be set as a date or age. Event costs can be set as a rate ($/ha), or a fixed cost. Biomass removal (roots, branches etc.) is dictated by the cutting event (thinning, clear-felling etc.) rather than the Stand Manager. Regimes apply to both Empirical and Process-based (physiological) models.
Biomass	Used to create and edit biomass sets used by Inventory and Stand Manager for modelling components of biomass.
Models	Used to select from available growth and tree-shape models in the Toolbox.

Health Tool	Description
Health Keys	A key to assist in the identification of health problems in plantation grown trees and other native forests in southern parts of Australia. The 'Health Tool' is an expert system for the major commercial eucalyptus plantation species used in southern Australia (Eucalyptus globulus & Eucalyptus nitens) and major commercial exotic pine species Pinus radiata.

== Development ==
Dr Andy Warner, then an employee of Private Forests Tasmania (PFT), conceived the concept of the Farm Forestry Toolbox in 1996. He obtained funding support for, and managed, the development of versions 1 to 5. Originally the Toolbox was promoted as a User Friendly PC Tree Modelling Package (versions 1 and 2). Dr Warner also conducted training courses around Australia and overseas. Now living in Thailand, he continued to support the ongoing development and promotion of the Toolbox for wider use internationally, until he closed the Project in 2024 (see Toolbox Project Closure below).

Adrian Goodwin was initially an employee of Forestry Tasmania and subsequently the principal of his forest consultancy company, Bushlogic. As a gifted biometrician, he applied his unique talents of a disciplined statistical approach, coupled with a keen interest in practical applications of complex growth and yield models in tree-related applications, to develop most of the code and tools in the various versions of the Toolbox. He presented the Toolbox to forest growers, foresters and educators in Australia and overseas.

He continued to expand the functionality of the Toolbox package until his sudden death due to complications following minor surgery in 2023.

== Toolbox Project Closure ==
Despite extensive inquiries in Australia and internationally during 2023-2024, no feasible option was identified that could satisfactorily address transferring the licensing restrictions inherent in some of the built-in models nor replace Adrian's unique set of programming and forest modelling skills and his deep understanding of the complex code underpinning the Toolbox. Consequently, it was decided to close the Project in 2024, nearly 30 years after its inception. It is hoped that the success of the user-friendly approach of the Toolbox and its widespread practical use over three decades will provide some guidance for future user-friendly farm forestry applications - "Map, Measure, Manage" are vital components of any successful tree development project.

== Toolbox distribution ==
The Toolbox was originally provided free of charge via CD and later could be downloaded from the PFT or Bushlogic websites. However, these options are no longer available.

The Toolbox was included in the 2009 CSIRO publication Agroforestry for Natural Resource Management.

A Workshop - The Farm Forestry Toolbox - Australia's most versatile and widely used forestry software, was conducted as part of the 8th Australia and the New Zealand Institute of Forestry (ANZIF) Conference (2015).

The Toolbox Inventory tool was recognised in A Standard for Valuing Commercial Forests in Australia, as a suitable tool to undertake inventory for the purposes of the Standard.

== Farm Forestry Toolbox version 5 ==
In 2008, Toolbox was completely re-written in VB.NET 2005 implementing .NET Framework 2. This resulted in an improved user interface, and provided an opportunity to streamline code.

Version 5 of the Toolbox is sensitive to international currency and date formatting. It is possible to set defaults for anywhere in the world and select any currency. Help and instructions and on-screen labels and headings in almost any language can be displayed by populating appropriately named folders with translated .RTF files.

A number of enhancements were made to Version 5.1, and labelled as Farm Forestry Toolbox Version 5.1 - Carbon Ready. These enhancements allow a user to model biomass components and explore changes in accumulation of biomass due to climate change and changes in growth rates for planted forests. Carbon planting regimes were developed and modifications to the 'Stand Manager' allows a user to explore options to use planted forests for carbon storage.

The Toolbox is able to be used for a wide range of plantation species in Australia, including mallee oil and sandalwood. It is also suitable for inventory in teak plantations in Southeast Asia.

Version 5 contains 50 taper models, 15 empirical growth models, and 4 process-based growth models (3 parameterisations of AGGRO and an adaption of 3PG for oil mallee). AGGRO calibrations for P. radiata and E. nitens were underway when the Project closed.

At various stages, the Toolbox was being used in universities in Germany, Thailand, Portugal, Ireland, Spain and Australia.

== Farm Forestry Toolbox Versions ==
=== General version history ===
Details	Version 1	Version 2.0 to 2.8	Version 3.0 to 3.12	Version 4.0 to 4.9	Version 5.0 to 5.3	Version 5.4 to current
Released/launched	March 1999	2000	2001	2003	2008 (5.3 released October 2012)	2017 (5.4.3a released 04/10/2017)
Release name	Helping Treegrowers Help Themselves	An aid to growing trees on farms	An aid to growing trees on farms	An aid to growing trees on farms	An aid to successfully growing trees on farms	Farm Forestry Toolbox.
Operating System	Microsoft Windows 95, 98 or NT	No change	No change	No change	Microsoft Windows XP onwards. VB.NET 2005 implementing .NET Framework 2	Microsoft Windows 10 (.NET Framework 4.7 in Visual Studio 2017)

=== Recent version history for Version 5.x.x ===
Version	Version Date	Version	Version Date	Version	Version Date
5.3.5	August 2014	5.4.4.e	09/07/2018	5.4.5.a	24/05/2019
5.3.6	September 2014	5.4.4.f	07/08/2018	5.4.5.b	27/05/2019
5.3.7i	June 2015	5.4.4.j	21/01/2019	5.4.5.c-g	29/05/2019
5.3.8	December 2015	5.4.4.k	12/02/2019	5.4.5.h	7/06/2019
5.3.8b	February 2016	5.4.4.l	12/02/2019	5.5.0.a	November 2021
5.4.2.v	29/03/2017	5.4.4.n	22/02/2019		
5.4.2.w	07/04/2017	5.4.4.p	25/02/2019		
5.4.2.y	30/04/2017	5.4.4.w	21/03/2019		
5.4.3.a	04/10/2017	5.4.4.x	14/03/2019		

== Contribution to Toolbox from researchers and others ==
The Toolbox was developed as a means of ensuring research output could be made available for forest owners and managers. The following summarises the contributions from researchers and others, including the organizations they worked for and when the contribution was made (these items were included as a part of the full Toolbox download).

3PG-FFT - (in Site Productivity and Stand Manager) - developed by Joe Landsberg and Richard Waring with additional contributions by Peter Sands and CSIRO.

AGGRO - (in Site Productivity and Stand Manager) - developed by Michael Battaglia of Ensis and CRC-Forestry with support for the Joint Venture Agro-Forestry Program (Rural Industries Research and Development Corporation/Land & Water Australia/Forest Wood Products Research Development Corporation/Murray Darling Basin Commission (Authority) - joint venture) (Project CPF-1A).

Biometric Models - Developed and programmed by Adrian Goodwin; Eric Keady (Forestry Plantations Queensland); Steve Candy (Forestry Tasmania); Jerry Vanclay (Southern Cross University); Yue Wang and Thomas Baker (School of Forest and Ecosystem Science, University of Melbourne) with the support of the Forests and Wood Products Research and Development Corporation and the Department of Primary Industries (Victoria); and Justin Wong (Department of Sustainability and Environment Victoria).

Forest Health Keys - Software concept and original programming by Tim Osborn (Forestry Tasmania). Keys prepared by Tim Wardlaw (Forestry Tasmania). Additional unpublished information, advice and comment were provided by the following specialists: Dick Bashford, Jane Elek, Andrew Walsh, Paul Adams (Forestry Tasmania); David de Little, Tim Hingston (Gunns Ltd); Dugald Close, Phil Smethurst, Clare McArthur, Caroline Mohammed, Geoff Allen, Marina Hurley (Cooperative Research Centre for Sustainable Production Forestry); Andy Warner. Unless otherwise acknowledged, photographs used in keys were taken by staff of Forestry Tasmania. Robyn Doyle provided many photographs taken specifically for use in this key.

Specialised models and data - Oil Mallee Production - Based on a concept by Alan Herbert, Senior Economist with AgWest and using growth models developed by John Bartle, Manager of the Farm Forestry Unit at Department of Conservation and Land Management (Western Australia); and Adrian Goodwin. Data provided by Kim Brooksbank (AgWest, Farm Forestry and Revegetation group), Dan Wildy (University of Western Australia) and the Future Farm Industries Cooperative Research Centre. Sandalwood Production - Data provided by Kim Brooksbank.

== Citation of Toolbox literature regarding modeling ==
The Toolbox has been used to model financial and wood yields, with the results being reported in peer-reviewed publications, theses, and reports and proceedings.

=== Peer reviewed publications ===
- Battaglia, Michael. and Sands, Peter. J., 1997. Modelling site productivity of Eucalyptus globulus in response to climate and site factors. Australian Journal of Plant Physiology, 24(6): 831 - 850.
- Kube, P. D., & Raymond, C. A., 2005. Breeding to Minimise the Effects of Collapse in Eucalyptus nitens Sawn Timber. Forest Genetics 12(1):23-24.
- Wood M.J., McLarin M.L., Volker P.W, and Syme M., 2009. Management of eucalypt plantations for profitable sawlog production in Tasmania, Australia. Tasforests Vol. 18 p 117.
- Warner A.J., Monton Jamroenprucksa and Ladawan Puangchit 2016. Development and evaluation of teak (Tectona grandis) taper equations in northern Thailand. Agriculture and Natural Resources 50(5):362-367.

=== Theses ===
- Baral, H. Ecosystem Goods and Services in Production Landscapes in South-Eastern Australia. Submitted in total fulfillment of the requirements of the degree of Doctor of Philosophy, Department of Forest and Ecosystem Science, Melbourne School of Land and Environment, The University of Melbourne. October 2013.
- Smith, A., The Development of Strategies for the Management and Research of Foliar Pathogens on Eucalypt Plantations: Using Mycosphaerella as a Case Study. Submitted in fulfillment of the requirements for the degree of Doctor of Philosophy, School of Agricultural Science, University of Tasmania, and CRC for Forestry and Ensis Forest Biosecurity and Protection, Hobart, Tasmania, Australia. June 2006.
- Kube, P.D, Genetic Improvement of Wood Properties of Eucalyptus nitens - Breeding to improve solid wood and pulp properties.. Submitted in fulfillment of the requirements for the degree of Doctor of Philosophy, University of Tasmania. April 2005
- Candy, S. G., Predictive Models for Integrated Pest Management of the Leaf Beetle Chrysophtharta bimaculata in Eucalyptus nitens Plantations in Tasmania. Submitted in fulfillment of the requirements for the Degree of Doctor of Philosophy, University of Tasmania, and Cooperative Research Centre for Sustainable Production Forestry, Hobart, Tasmania, Australia. December 1999.
- Warner, A.J. Development and Evaluation of Teak (Tectona grandis L.f.) Taper Equations in Northern Thailand. Submitted in fulfillment of the requirements for the Degree of Doctor of Philosophy. Faculty of Forestry, Kasetsart University. Bangkok, Thailand. 2016.

=== Reports and conference proceedings ===
2002

- Osborn, T., and Warner, A., 2002. A Tree Health Diagnostic Tool for Farm Forestry Toolbox 4. Australian Forest Grower, Vol. 25, No. 3, Spring 2002: 16.
- Wood, M.J., Volker, P.W. and Syme, M. (2002). Eucalyptus plantations for sawlog production in Tasmania, Australia: optimising thinning regimes. Forestry Tasmania, Division of Forest Research and Development, Hobart, Tasmania, Australia.

2004

- Greave, B., Dutkowski, G., & McRae, T., 2004. Breeding Objectives for 'Eucalyptus globulus' for products other than Kraft pulp. IUFRO Conference - Eucalyptus in a changing world. Aveiro, Portugal 11–15 October 2015.
- Freudenberger D., Cawsey, E.M., Stol, J., & West, P.W., 2004. Sustainable firewood supply in the Murray-Darling Basin. CSIRO: Canberra.
- Wardlaw, T., 2004. The impact of a single epidemic of Mycosphaerella leaf blight on the growth of Eucalyptus globulus. Division of Forest Research and Development, Technical Report 15/2004, Forestry Tasmania, Hobart.
- Warner, A., 2004. Farm-Level Blackwood Experience: Tasmanian Observations in Blackwood Management: Learning from New Zealand. Proceedings of an International Workshop, Rotorua, New Zealand, 22 November 2002. Edited by A.G. Brown. A report for the RIRDC/Land & Water Australia/FWPRDC/MDBC Joint Venture Agroforestry Program July 2004. RIRDC Publication No 04/086.

2005

- Finnigan, J., and Poulton, R., 2005. Commercial tree growing options with the Tasmanian NAP region : a computer based strategic investigation. Australian Forest Growers and Private Forests Tasmania, 2005
- Volker, P., W., Greaves, B., & Wood, M. Silvicultural Management of Eucalypt Plantation for Solid Wood and Engineered Wood Products - Experience from Tasmania, Australia in Plantation Eucalyptus: Challenge in Product Development: Proceedings of the International Conference on Plantation Eucalyptus, Zhanjiang, Guangdong, China, November 28 - December 1, 2005. Science Pres, Beijing. Editors Li Xiuwei, Liu Jing, Gai Yu, Li Feng. Chinese Research Institute of Wood Industry, China Eucalyptus Research Center.

2008

- Dickenson, I. 2008. Balancing the three-legged stool: a Case Study of Forest Conversion and Conservation in Biodiversity: Integrating Conservation and Production - Case Studies from Australian farms, forests and fisheries. Edited by. Lefroy, T. Baily, K. Unwin, G & Norton, T. CSIRO Publishing.

2009

- Baral, H., Kasel, S., Keenan, R., Fox, J., and Stork, N., 2009. GIS - based classification, mapping and valuation of ecosystem services in production landscapes: A case study of the Green Triangle region of south-eastern Australia. In: Forestry: a climate of change, Thistlethwaite, R., Lamb, D., and Haines, R. (eds). pp. 64 –71. Proc. IFA Conference. Caloundra, Queensland, Australia, 6–10 September 2009.

2010

- Livingston, S., 2010. Wood Production Options: Case Studies for Carbon Plantations – Extending R&D to best management practices for carbon sequestration, wood production and new investment opportunities on private land in Tasmania. Funding from the Australian Government Department of Agriculture, Fisheries and Forestry under its Forest Industries Climate Change Research Fund program.

2011

- Roberts, S., Read, S., McLarin, M., & Admans, P.,Predicting the water-use of Eucalyptus nitens plantations in Tasmania using a Forest Estate Model. Forest & Wood Products Australia, Project Number: PNC143.0809 September 2011.
- Morgan, H., 2011. Benefits of Restoring Skyline Tier Scamander Plantation, Tasmania. June 2011. Author Helen Morgan, Bushways Environmental Services – Tasmania. Prepared for The North East Bioregional Network -
- Wardlaw, T., 2011. Managing Biotic Risk in Developing a Eucalypt Resource: Learning from Australia and Elsewhere. Wood Technology Research Centre, Marlboro Research Centre, New Zealand. 2011, p 105 – 124.

2012

- Hydrological Impacts and Productivity Interactions of Integrated Oil Mallee Farming Systems: Landscape scale effects of dispersed mallee plantings. Edited by Kim Brooksbank.RIRDC Publication No. 11/161. RIRDC Project No. PRJ-000477
- May, B., M., Bulinski, J., Goodwin,.A & Macleod, S. Tasmanian Forest Carbon Study
- pitt&sherry. 2012 Potential Timber Production Estimate from the Tasmanian Private Plantation Estate. Prepared for: Independent Verification Group. Prepared by: pitt&sherry and Esk Mapping & GIS Services for February 2012.

2013

- Sohn, J., McElhinny, C., Hilbig,. E., Grove, S., and Bauhus, J., 2013. A Simplified Inventory Approach for Estimating Carbon in Coarse Woody Debris in High Biomass Forests. Papers and Proceedings of the Royal Society of Tasmania, Volume 147, 2013 p 15–23.

2014

- Chan, H., 2014 A Case Study Using the Farm Forestry Toolbox to Determine Timber Volumes, Values and Financial Outcomes for Farm Forests. Presented at the Australian Forest Growers, National Farm Forestry Conference in Lismore, NSW. October 2014

== See also ==
- Deforestation
- Forest farming
- Forest informatics
- Forestry
- Private nonindustrial forest land
