= Dynamic agroforestry =

Successional multi-strata agroforestry system

Dynamic agroforestry (DAF, also Dynamic agroforest systems) is a form of successional, multi-strata agroforestry in which annual crops, perennial cash crops, fruit trees and timber trees are grown together at high density and managed through regular pruning that follows the dynamics of natural forest succession. It aims to build soil fertility, biodiversity and resilience without synthetic external inputs, and is applied most widely in cocoa (cacao) production in the humid tropics. The method is closely associated with work in the Alto Beni region of Bolivia, where it has been developed and applied since the 1990s.

== Method ==
Dynamic agroforestry plots combine many species with differing life cycles and light requirements in the same area, filling the canopy at several vertical levels at once. Short-lived pioneer plants and annual crops occupy the system in its early stages, while longer-lived fruit, timber and cash-crop trees mature over time, so that the composition shifts through successive stages in imitation of the way a natural forest regenerates. A commercial crop such as cocoa is grown within this changing structure rather than in a single-species stand.

Management centres on frequent, selective pruning. Cutting back biomass returns organic matter to the soil, stimulates regrowth, and regulates light and space for the target crops, which is intended to sustain fertility internally instead of through mineral fertiliser. Because it relies on management skill rather than external inputs, the approach has been described as knowledge-intensive, and it has been adapted to both smallholder plots and larger commercial operations.

=== Principles ===
The principles commonly ascribed to dynamic agroforestry include high-density, multi-strata planting; the management of ecological succession so that earlier species create conditions for those that follow; the use of regular pruning of biomass to drive soil fertility; and the maintenance of closed nutrient cycles without synthetic inputs. A 2012 report describing the method states that "one of the most important measures for the improvement and maintenance of soil fertility in dynamic agroforestry production systems is the continuous addition of woody (ligneous) organic material … as a result of pruning measures."

== Origins and terminology ==
The ecological principles underlying dynamic agroforestry—high-density planting, managed succession, stratification of species, and heavy pruning—were formulated by the Swiss farmer and researcher Ernst Götsch, who developed this form of production in Brazil during the 1970s and 1980s. Götsch's own approach is generally termed syntropic or successional agriculture. These ideas reached the Alto Beni region of Bolivia in 1995, following a visit by Götsch to the cocoa-cooperative organisation El Ceibo, after which the approach was taken up locally.

In Bolivia the method was further developed and named by the agronomist and researcher Joachim Milz—who had worked in the Alto Beni region from 1982 with the German Development Service (DED, later part of GIZ)—together with the consultancy Ecotop and local farmers. The term Dynamic Agroforestry appears on the Ecotop website in a capture from December 2005 preserved by the Internet Archive, where the organisation presents its methodology under the trilingual names Sistemas Agroforestales Sucesionales / Dynamic Agroforest Systems / Sukzessionale Agroforstsysteme. The principles of "Dynamic Agroforestry Systems" were set out in a 2012 report by Milz published by the German development agency GIZ.

== Applications ==
Dynamic agroforestry is used chiefly in cocoa production, but has also been applied to coffee, fruit and other tropical crops. Beyond its base in Alto Beni, the method and associated training have been documented in projects elsewhere in Latin America and, through development cooperation, in parts of Asia, including a GIZ programme in the Malinau and Kapuas Hulu districts of Indonesia.

The approach has also been promoted in West Africa, where, according to a research fact sheet from the World Food System Center at ETH Zurich, it was introduced by Ecotop as an option for sustainable cocoa production. In Ghana, the Ghana Cocoa Board (COCOBOD) and the Cocoa Research Institute of Ghana (CRIG) have established dynamic agroforestry demonstration plots and, with support from Swiss partners, examined the method as a way to restore farmland degraded by cocoa swollen shoot virus disease and to improve the resilience of cocoa farms. The adoption of dynamic agroforestry in cocoa has become the subject of dedicated research, including a FiBL study of its global adoption—with Ecotop among the partners—covering case studies in Ecuador and Ghana.

== Scientific evaluation ==
Dynamic agroforestry has been evaluated in the long-term farming-systems comparison trial (SysCom) established in 2008 at Sara Ana in the Alto Beni region of Bolivia, coordinated by the Research Institute of Organic Agriculture (FiBL) together with Ecotop and local partners. The trial compares cocoa grown under dynamic agroforestry, simpler agroforestry and monoculture, under both organic and conventional management. Results published from the trial have reported that agroforestry systems can achieve cocoa yields comparable to monoculture while supporting greater biodiversity and soil health.

In Ghana, the Cocoa Research Institute of Ghana (CRIG), under COCOBOD, has established dynamic agroforestry trial plots to compare the method against the country's conventional cocoa cultivation practice and to identify the most suitable design for local conditions.

== See also ==
- Agroforestry
- Syntropic agriculture
- Analog forestry
