= Forest informatics =

Combined science of forestry and informatics

Forest informatics is the combined science of forestry and informatics, with a special emphasis on collection, management, and processing of data, information and knowledge, and the incorporation of informatic concepts and theories specific to enrich forest management and forest science; it has a similar relationship to library science and information science.

It is an interdisciplinary science primarily concerned with the collection, classification, manipulation, storage, retrieval and dissemination of information. Information, in this context, includes both human and machine readable documents. Examples of human readable documents include maps, field data sheets, operational schedules, and long term asset management plans with narrative text. Machine readable documents include files for geographic information systems (GIS), Global Positioning Systems (GPS), and other applications like spreadsheets, and relational database management systems.

As in management science, Forest Informatics uses decision support systems, mathematical modeling, statistics, and algorithms from engineering, operations research, computer science, and artificial intelligence to support decision-making activities. Common forestry problems include harvest scheduling, model fitting, optimal sampling, remote sensing, crew assignment, image classification, treatment timing, and log bucking problems, many of which can be formulated as optimization problems (e.g. generalized assignment problem, traveling salesman problem, knapsack problem, job shop scheduling, and vehicle routing problems). The practice includes information processing and the engineering of information systems, decision support systems, GIS, and GPS. The research field includes studies the structure, algorithms, behavior, and interactions of natural and artificial systems that store, process, access and communicate information about forested ecosystems.

== History ==
In 1970, J. G. Grevatt wrote an article titled, "Management Information and Computers in Forestry". In the article, the author describes and discusses different dimensions of management information (i.e. operation, expenditure, location, and time) including the nature of management information and decisions, management information in forestry, the management information system itself, the application of computers, the structure of a computer based system, comparisons between clerical and computer systems, and the impact on the field manager. The author concludes that the use of computers to process management data may be justified on grounds of cost and improved information in organizations of a critical size.

At the time of that article, computers, databases, and geographic information systems were still in their infancy and tools like the Global Positioning Systems of today were yet invented. Management database systems for business were more prevalent. Over the next 30 years, computers became more powerful, smaller, and less expensive. Relational database management systems had become commonplace in business, interrogating the computer system had become standardized with languages like SQL, and faster networks for data and information integration have become highly integrated. In that time, geographic information systems that could run on desktop computers and could be customized for various tasks were also developed, but as separate systems.

Within the last 10 years, specialized fields of study at the university level are offered at the several forestry schools where students learn the principles of quantification, modeling, descriptive and predictive analyses of natural resources attributes needed for sound management of forested ecosystems.

At the small forester practitioner level, more software "back-end" programs have become available to model likely forest growth outcomes based on treatment prescriptions. These are provided by private businesses, such as Assisisoft, as well as government agencies, such as the U.S. Forestry Service's NED system. The basic functions of the NED system is commonly used among American consulting foresters, as it is free, although a small proportion of that group uses the full modeling capabilities of the software. With the prevalence of smartphone and tablet access, the computing power available in the woods is now much higher than it was just a few years ago when PocketPC-based systems were prevalent. Microsoft announced it will deprecate the PocketPC platform in March 2013. New apps, such as Forest Metrix, are now becoming available for foresters and timber cruisers to employ their devices for data collection for later export into more sophisticated software.

Software specifically devoted to analyzing management decisions for forested ecosystems have been developed, and used in several large scale planning projects. For example, the Ecosystem Management Decision Support (EMDS) system is an application framework for knowledge-based decision support of ecological analysis and planning. Open source software solutions have also become more widely accepted as well, as is seen in the expansion of ecological extensions for statistical tools like R. A recent example would be the book written by Andrew Robinson and Jeff D. Hamann about using R for forest analytics.

In 2006, the United Nations declared 2011 to be International Year of Forests.

Forest Informatics, Inc. has developed a postgresql template, a set of software agents, and a collection of reports, maps, and data feeds. The application uses an intelligent agent architecture to preemptively generate possible strategic, tactical, and operational solutions for forest managers.

== Contributing disciplines ==
- Math
- Artificial intelligence
- Computer science
- Information science
- Information theory
- Information technology
- Biodiversity Informatics
- Ecoinformatics
- Evolutionary informatics
- Geoinformatics
- Mathematical logic
- Graph theory
- Computational geometry
- Geographic Information Systems

== See also ==
- Environmental informatics
- Conservation biology
- Farm Forestry Toolbox
- Forestknowledge.net
- Global Forest Information Service
- i-Tree
- Sustainability
