= Kirstie Fryirs =

Australian geomorphologist

- Education: Ph.D. fluvial geomorphology and river management, Macquarie University, 2002; B.S. fluvial geomorphology, Macquarie University, 1996; B.S. physical geography and resource and environmental management, Macquarie University, 1995
- Known for: Co-creator of River Styles Framework
- Awards: Gordon Warwick Medal (2015)
- Scientific career
- Fields: geomorphology
- Institutions: Macquarie University
- Thesis: A geomorphic approach for assessing the condition and recovery potential of rivers application in Bega Catchment, South Coast, New South Wales, Australia (2001)

Kirstie Fryirs is an Australian geomorphologist researching fluvial geomorphology and river management.

== Early life and education ==
Fryirs is originally from Sydney, Australia. She has a Bachelor of Science (Honours) and Ph.D. from Macquarie University for her 2001 thesis titled "A geomorphic approach for assessing the condition and recovery potential of rivers application in Bega Catchment, South Coast, New South Wales, Australia".

== Career and impact ==
As of 2021 Fryirs is Deputy Associate Dean Research in the Faculty of Science and Engineering at Macquarie University. She is dedicated to university teaching and research, as well as outreach activities focused on scientific communication.

She is best known for the creation of the tool for evaluating river condition called River Styles Framework with the Australian specialist Gary Brierley.

Fryirs is currently working with other researchers from Macquarie University, in promoting "river champions in order to realize sustainable, participatory river and water management in Australia".

== Awards ==
Fryirs holds several awards on research, teaching and postgraduate supervision. She was awarded the international Gordon Warwick Medal at the British Society for Geomorphology in 2015. She also researched heavy metal contamination at Casey and Wilkes stations in Antarctica for two summer seasons.

== Selected works ==
- Geomorphology and River Management, Blackwell, 2005
- River Futures, Island Press, 2008
- Geomorphic Analysis of River Systems: An Approach to Reading the Landscape, Wiley, 2013
