= Waldwissen =

Forestry information and communication platform

waldwissen.net
- Website type: Information and Communication Platform
- Available in: German, English, French, Italian
- Owners: FVA, LWF, BFW, WSL
- Website: www.waldwissen.net/en/
- Commercial: No
- Launched: 2005

Waldwissen is an international, multilingual information and communication website for a wide range of forestry topics.

== Organization ==
The Website www.waldwissen.net is published by the Forest Research Institute of Baden-Württemberg, Freiburg, Germany (FVA), the Bavarian Forest Institute, Freising, Germany (LWF), the Federal Research and Training Centre for Forests, Natural Hazards and Landscape, Vienna, Austria (BFW) and the Swiss Federal Institute for Forest, Snow and Landscape Research, Birmensdorf, Switzerland (WSL).

The network comprises forest research institutes, forest administrations, forest owner associations and other non-governmental organisations offering access to expert knowledge. The interactive platform has established itself in Central Europe as the leading online-information source for a wide range of forestry and forest-related topics. In July 2023, over 2700 German-language and approx. 950 foreign-language articles were available.

In addition to the four publishing research institutes from Germany, Austria and Switzerland, a number of other partner institutions have contributed to www.waldwissen.net. All partners involved use their own resources for financing their editorial staff. As of August 2023 each of the ten editorial offices compiles and edits expert information and then presents it on the web-portal. They cooperate with organisations such as the Swiss National Accident Insurance Fund, the Federal Office for the Environment, the Swiss Ornithological Station Sempach, the University of Natural Resources and Life Sciences in Vienna, the Bavarian Forest Genetics Office (AWG) and the Rottenburg University of Applied Forest Sciences.

== History ==
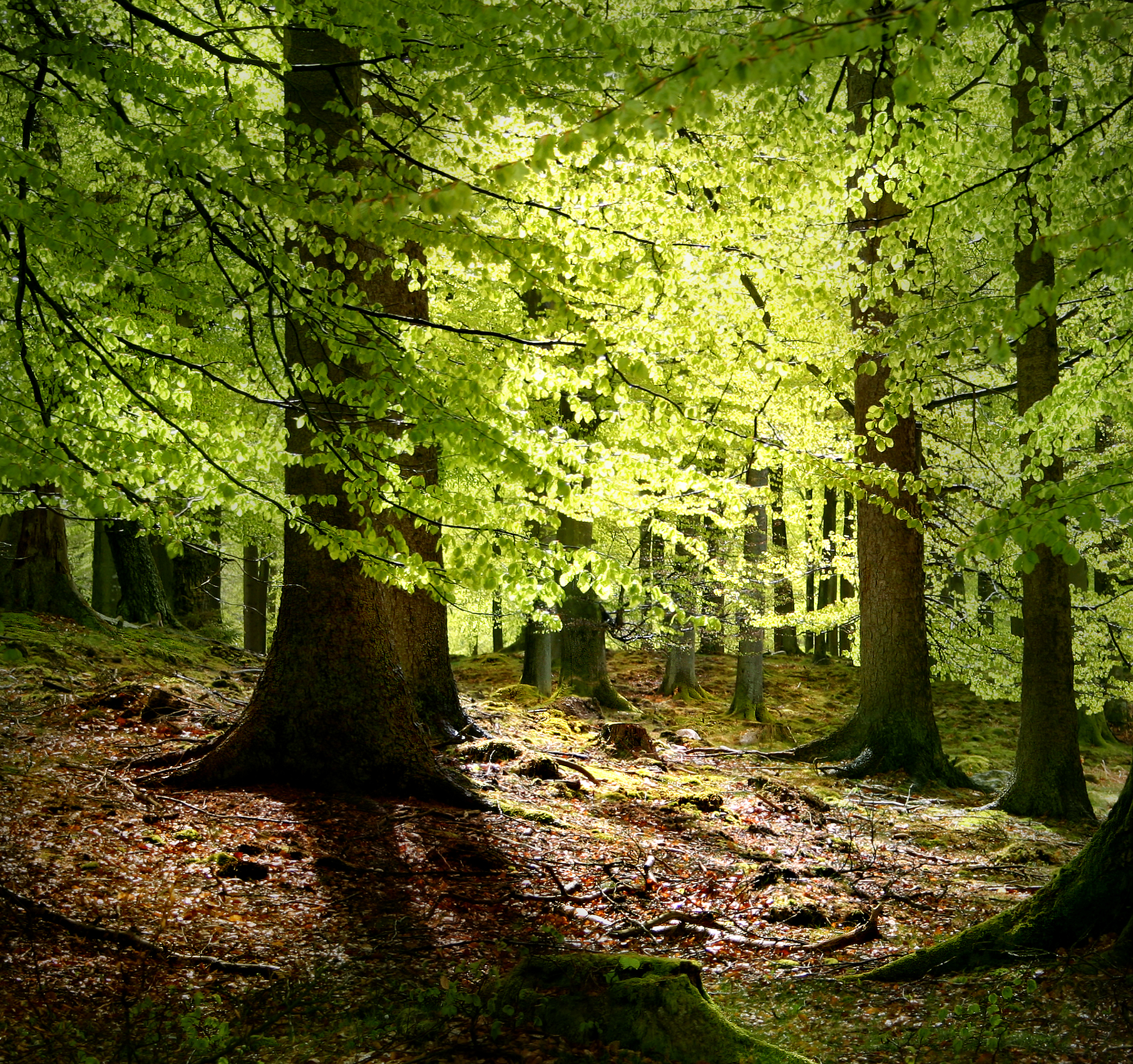
The forest ecosystem

The Federal Research Institute (WSL) had the idea of making relevant practical knowledge from forestry and environmental science available for everyone in an easily accessible forum. In the summer of 2003, the prototype www.waldwissen.ch went online.

The experience gained from www.waldwissen.ch was very positive. At the same time, the four research institutes involved in forest research FVA, LWF, BFW, WSL intensified their efforts to develop a joint forest information system with contents from international sources. This project was part of the KnowForAlp Initiative comprising in total 19 research institutes from seven countries. From this initiative emerged www.waldwissen.net which went online on 16 February 2005.

Since then, the number of contributions to www.waldwissen.net and the supply of forestry expertise has continued to grow. In 2007, www.waldwissen.net was awarded the Schweighofer Innovation Award for Forestry with a total of 50.000 euros in prize money. The internationality, multilingualism and the professionalism of the contributions to www.waldwissen.net made an especially favourable impression on the jury. The prize money was used for the further development and the redesign of the website. Since mid-2015 www.waldwissen.net is also available as a Mobile app for Android and Apple iOS.

== See also ==
- European Forest Downstream Services (EUFODOS)
- Forest informatics
- Global Forest Information Service
