= Agroforestry Research Trust =

British charitable organisation

The Agroforestry Research Trust (ART) is a British charitable incorporated organisation that researches temperate agroforestry and all aspects of plant cropping and uses, with a focus on tree, shrub and perennial crops. It produces several publications and a quarterly journal, and sells plants and seeds from its forest gardens.

The trust is managed by Martin Crawford, and has a 2-acre (8,100 m^{2}) forest garden, next to the Schumacher College in Dartington, Devon, in the United Kingdom. It makes heavy use of ground cover plants to restrict the growth of weeds.

== See also ==
- Forest gardening
