= Ernst Götsch =

Swiss farmer and researcher

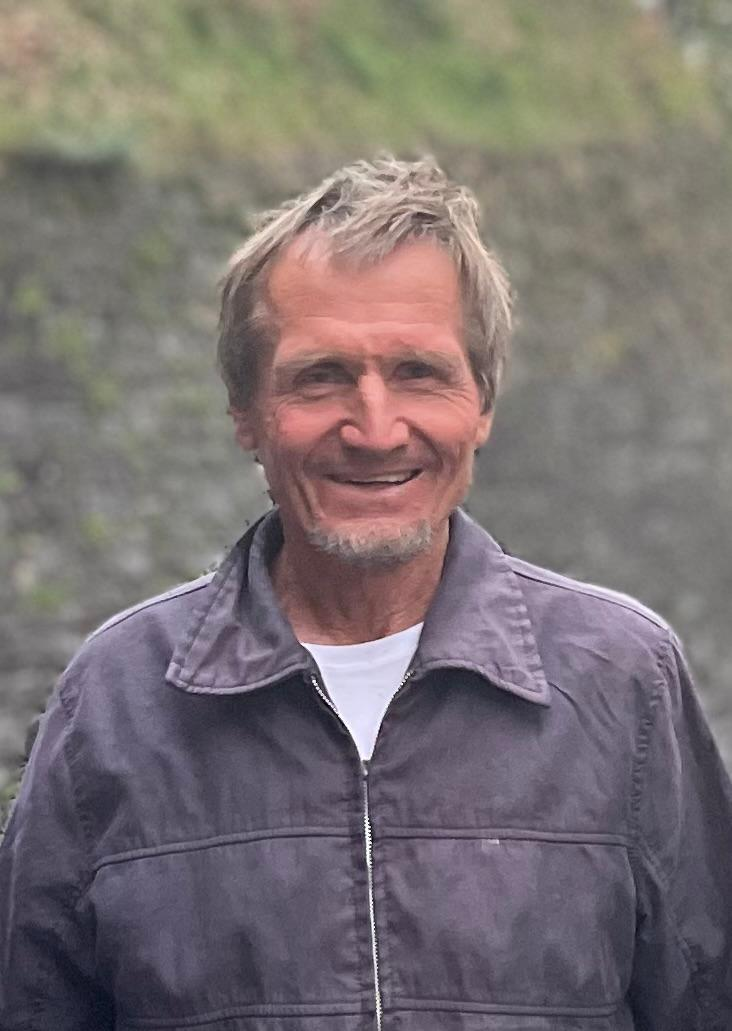
- Born: 14.01.1948; Raperswilen, Switzerland

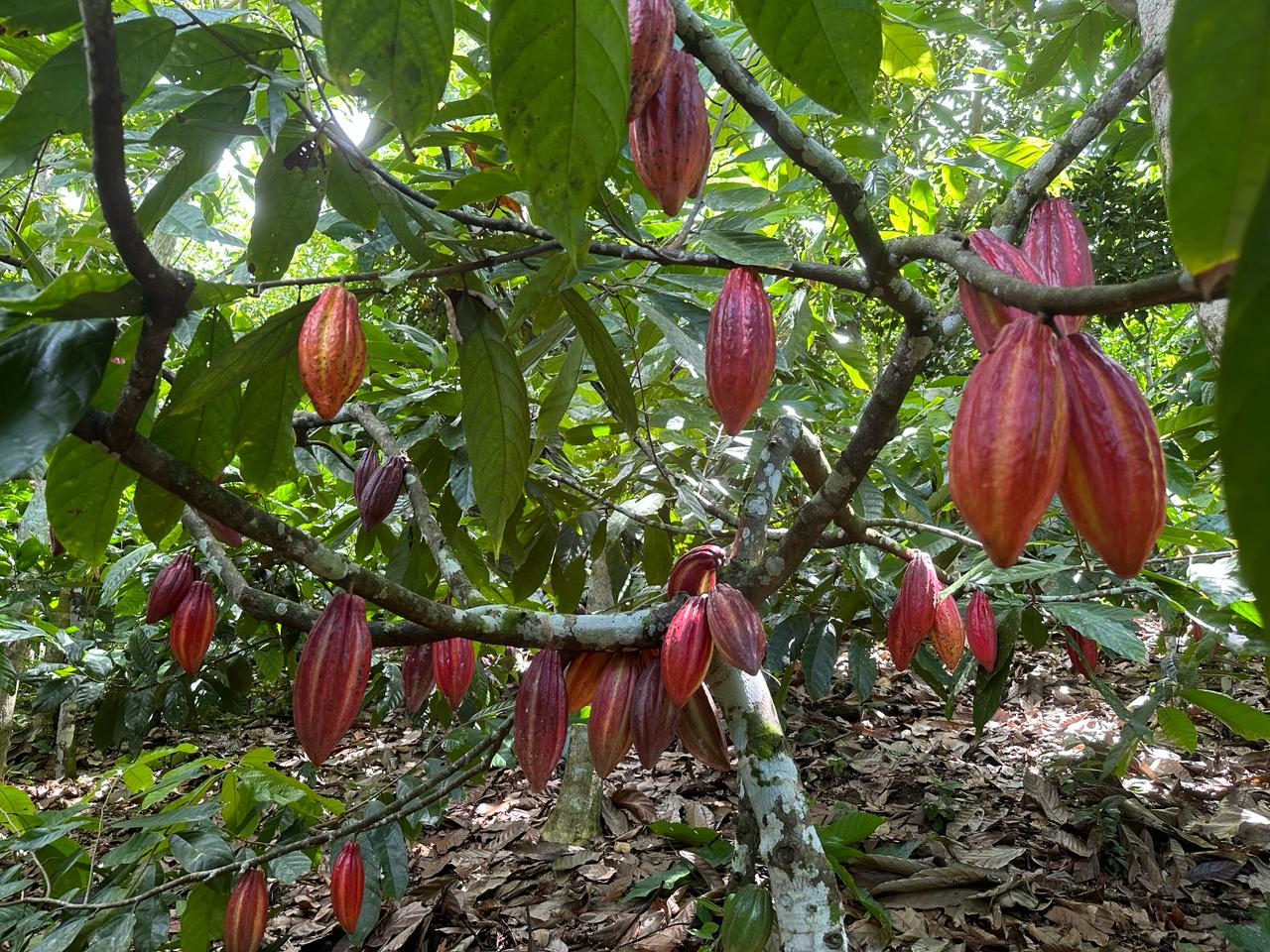
Cocoa tree with fruit at Fazenda Olhos d'Agua, BA, Brazil

Ernst Götsch (born 1948) is a Swiss farmer and researcher working mostly in Brazil. He has advocated for an ancient system of climate and biodiversity-friendly sustainable farming techniques known as syntropic agriculture.

== Biography ==
Götsch was born in 1948 in Raperswilen, Switzerland, and moved to Brazil in the early 1980s, establishing himself in a farm in Southern Bahia. Years before, he had decided to quit a research job on genetic enhancement at FAP Zürich-Reckenholz. He has been dedicated to giving lectures, courses and consulting to publicize knowledge of his approach, which has now been dubbed 'syntropic agriculture'. He has taught agroforestry at The Intuitive Technology and Bio-Architecture School.

== Approach ==
Götsch has achieved renown due to the results of his methods, evident in the successes of his farm Olhos D’Água. The farm has been visited by Brazilian government agencies that carry out environmental control. It is considered notable because the land was previously considered hopelessly degraded by the farming community, and in a few short years, has been restored to levels of biodiversity and productivity that compare well with untouched forest regions in the Amazon region.

Götsch's work in Latin America on models of agroforestry has led to the conversion of large tracts of degraded land into productive and diverse agroforests. He has developed a new technique of rapid recovery of poor soils by imitating existing patterns in nature in which carefully selected species of plants – a consortium of species – are placed at a given spacing and orientation, introduced in a predetermined sequence, and are heavily pruned during their growth period at regular intervals. In the space of a few years, he has converted over 1200 acres of degraded land in Brazil into a productive rainforest that produces premium cacao, among other things. His students and some businesses are now implementing the same techniques combining commercial and ecological interests.

Some key principles of his approach include:

- Process-based, not input-based: Rather than seeking to add nutrients from outside sources, syntropic agriculture mimics and accelerates natural succession processes to capture carbon, water, nutrients (via wildlife) and diversity in degraded and undeveloped land.
- Heavy pruning: To add biomass to the soil, retain soil moisture, open up canopy, increase carbon capture and transpiration.
- 'Water is planted (‘Água se planta!’)' By introducing plants that store water, and increase transpiration.
- 'Turn our enemies into our friends.' Farmers should look for plants that are green all year (even in severe drought, especially weeds) and plant many of these. These should include tree such as eucalypts that if managed correctly can help protect and foster less robust species, and produce much organic matter quickly to cover and rebuild the soil.
