= Martin Crawford =

Martin Crawford is a British author who is the founder and director of the Agroforestry Research Trust.

He runs regular tours of the 2-acre forest garden at Dartington in Devon as well as the Littlehempston site as well as courses in the design of Forest Gardens. In March 2025 Crawford was given notice to vacate the forest garden at Dartington Estate which led to more than 33,000 people signing a petition to oppose the move.

== Books ==
- Crawford, M. (1993). Bee Plants. Agroforestry Research Trust. ISBN 9781874275220.
- Creating a Forest Garden: Working with Nature to Grow Edible Crops. Green Books. 2010.
- How to Grow Perennial Vegetables. Green Books. 2012.
- Food from your Forest Garden (with Caroline Aitken). Green Books. 2013
- Trees for Gardens, Orchards and Permaculture. Permanent Publications. 2015.
- How to Grow your own Nuts. Green Books. 2016.
- Shrubs for Gardens, Agroforestry and Permaculture. Permanent Publications. 2020
