= Global Forest Information Service =

Defunct collaborative forest organization

The Global Forest Information Service (GFIS) was an initiative of the Collaborative Partnership on Forests (CPF) and was a collaborative effort of 14 major forest-related international organizations, institutions and convention secretariat, aiming to maximize the value of all forest information resources and providers worldwide through the sharing of forest-related information through a single gateway. The effort was discontinued in 2021.

== Aims ==
In the global policy context, the vision and mission of GFIS are consistent with the resolutions of the United Nations Forum on Forests (UNFF) and the priorities of the CPF. GFIS was led by the International Union of Forest Research Organizations (IUFRO); together with FAO, the Food and Agriculture Organization of the United Nations; the Center for International Forestry Research (CIFOR); the UNFF Secretariat; and the Biological Informatics Office of the United States Geological Survey (USGS/BIO).

== History ==
In 1998, the International Consultation on Research and Information Systems in Forestry which was held in Gmunden, Austria, recommended that the Intergovernmental Forum on Forests (IFF) should endorse and promote the development of a Global Forest Information Service to enhance access to all forest-related information, ensuring that it is accessible to all stakeholders including policy-makers, forest managers, non-governmental organizations, community groups and the public at large.

Consequently, the IFF requested Inter-agency Task Force on Forests member organizations to work with International Union of Forest Research Organizations (IUFRO) in exploring possibilities for a global forest information service. In implementing this request, IUFRO initiated various activities to establish GFIS. These included the establishment of a GFIS Task Force, the development of a GFIS information server and web-interface as well as the implementation of the "GFIS Africa" project to strengthen institutional capacities in developing countries.

The first version of GFIS was presented at the IUFRO European Conference in Copenhagen, Denmark, in August 2002 and successfully demonstrated at the XII World Forestry Congress in Quebec, Canada, in September 2003. It included contributions from over 60 forestry institutions from all regions of the world.

In May 2004, the Collaborative Partnership on Forests (CPF) agreed that GFIS should become a joint initiative. In response, IUFRO, the Food and Agriculture Organization of the United Nations, the Center for International Forestry Research and the United Nations Forum on Forests laid the ground work for further development of GFIS as a joint CPF initiative which was approved September 2004 at the 13th Meeting of the CPF in New York.

In August 2005, the new GFIS search service was launched the XXII IUFRO World Congress held in Brisbane, Australia. The GFIS gateway catalogued key information resources, such as news, events, publications and job vacancies supplied by information providers. Since 2007, there have been continual technological advances to GFIS carried out by Finnish Forest Research Institute (Metla) which features improved search tool and windows to the news, events, publications, forest-related jobs & educational resources.

Since 2007 there have been continual technological advances to GFIS carried out by Finnish Forest Research Institute (Metla) which features improved search tool and windows to the news, events, publications and job opportunities, and educational resources.

In 2021 IUFRO decided not to continue GFIS as a separate entity and instead focus on creating its own online information resources centre, so the www.gfis.net website was taken down. They have created a webpage describing the history of the effort.

== See also ==
- European Forest Downstream Services (EUFODOS)
- Forestknowledge.net
- World Forestry Center
