= House cow =

Cow providing milk for a home kitchen

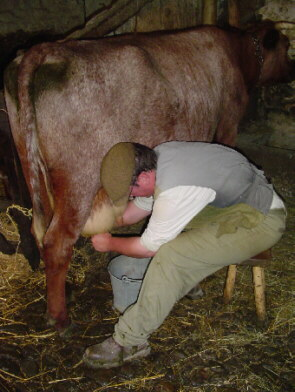
As they are not farmed as part of a commercial operation, house cows are usually milked by hand

A house cow is a cow kept to provide milk for a home kitchen. This differentiates them from dairy cows, which are farmed commercially. They can also provide manure, for use as a garden fertilizer, and their offspring can be a source of meat.

House cows are used in locations, usually rural, without convenient access to a supply of commercial dairy products. They can also be kept for household self-sufficiency, and a preference for organically farmed food.

== History ==
In England, during the 18th century, families would take their house cow, and other livestock, to graze on the local common land. In the 1770s, before common land began to be enclosed as private land, it was estimated that even a 'poor' house cow, 'providing a gallon of milk per day' was worth, in the milking season, 'half the equivalent of a labourer's annual wage' to a family.

Writing for an American audience in 1905, Kate Saint Maur asserted:

In fact, the country home without a cow, is like a coach without horses - so hopelessly stuck does the house keeper become who tries to provide a varied bill of fare without dairy produce. Away from city markets, a cow is a downright necessity.

In 1910, during the United States' Presidency of William Howard Taft, Senator Isaac Stephenson had a house cow called 'Pauline Wayne', a Holstein Friesian, sent from his Wisconsin farm to the White House to provide fresh milk for the first family. After arrival she 'grazed contentedly upon the White House lot, oblivious to the general fuss being made'.

In Australia, house cows were still common enough for the New South Wales government to issue a free booklet on their management and care in 1953.

== Popular breeds ==
In the 19th century, Breton cattle, from Brittany, France, were imported into England and promoted as an ideal house cow breed because of their docile nature and small size.

Shetland cattle, from the Shetland Isles, off the north coast of Scotland, are a small, hardy cattle breed, which, until recent times, were traditionally milked three times a day—morning, twall (midday) and night—to produce the maximum amount of milk, which could be more than three gallons.

The Dexter cattle breed, which originated in southwestern Ireland, is small, easy-to-keep and suited for milk and meat, is known as 'the poor man's house cow'.
