= Land & Water Australia =

Australian government entity

Coordinates: 35°16′53.76″S 149°07′26.13″E

Agency overview
- Jurisdiction: Commonwealth of Australia
- Website: lwa.gov.au

Footnotes
- Archive

Land & Water Australia was an Australian statutory corporation established under the Primary Industries and Energy Research and Development Act of 1989. Its primary focus was to organize and fund research and development activities which improved the long term productive capacity, sustainable use, management and conservation of Australia's land, water and vegetation resources.

It also acted as a research broker, organising collaborative programs like Managing Climate Variability and the National Program for Sustainable Irrigation.

The research programs of Land & Water Australia were managed to facilitate the purposeful co-investment of government and other funds to achieve natural resource management outcomes in 'productive lands' (a phrase used to differentiate it from land used predominantly for conservation, Indigenous or Defence purposes). The focus of most programs was on co-investment with research, policy and practitioners to get existing and new knowledge into the minds and hands of people who could use it. After the agency was closed responsibility for some programs and project was transferred.

Land & Water Australia was closed in December 2009 as part of the government's 2009 - 2010 Budget.

Over the twenty years people at Land & Water Australia learned and contributed a great deal in terms of science and policy understanding about managing Australian landscapes. They also learned a great deal about the business of investing in collaborative applied research, development and extension. These insights are reflected in the following publications:

The Getting of Knowledge: a guide to funding and managing applied research

The Australian NRM Knowledge System: an analysis of how well current arrangements generate and organise the knowledge needed for Australia to manage its natural resource more wisely

Knowledge for Managing Australian Landscapes (PDF): a comprehensive analysis of the knowledge needed for sustainable natural resource management in Australia and areas for improvement.

The legacy of Land & Water Australia was the subject of a conference and a promised publication held at the Australian Academy of Science's Shine Dome on May 18–19, 2010, Canberra. Presentations and audio from the conference are available to download .

A list of achievements selected by the agency include:

- the first work that identified the risk of endocrine disrupting chemicals in Australian waterways
- the AUSRIVAS system for measuring river health
- a wetting front detector to save irrigation water
- revealing a huge gap in our water accounts caused by double counting
- uncovering the myriad ways Australia farmers are adapting to our notoriously variable climate
- developing innovative incentives for farmers undertaking conservation works
- ‘controlled traffic’ farming systems to improve soil productivity and health
- identifying of the role of phosphorus, nitrogen and other factors in the development of blue-green algae in the Murray-Darling
- fundamental new research on Australia's tropical river systems
- being the first to fund a high-profile project on eco-system services, which has gone on to become the framework for natural resource management and science in Australia and is of growing importance internationally
- working closely with the cotton industry to eliminate pesticide contamination of waterways
- working with the wool, meat and grains industries to develop more-sustainable mixed farming systems, research that won a Banksia Environmental Award
- developing, through the dryland salinity program, the model for collaboration of states and other agencies to address the major landscape challenge of dryland salinity. This program, which began in 1993, continues to inform management of Australian landscapes and reduce costs to agriculture.
- leading multi-partner programs to manage climate variability and Australia's northern rivers, improve irrigation systems, and develop Australia's national Climate Change Research Strategy for Primary Industries.
- through post-graduate scholarships, LWA has supported research training for more than 100 of the country's brightest young environmental scientists.

Hyperlinks (see below) to programs, projects and documents started to fail in 2015, reducing accessibility. There is concern that this substantial investment in knowledge to inform Australia's long-term social, environmental and economic well-being could be lost. However, knowledge resides in many people and agencies. An important Director of LWA, Peter Cullen, used to say, the challenge was to "make new mistakes". Land & Water Australia has a legacy of innovative, high impact and important research.

== Land & Water Australia's Legacy ==
=== Research Program Evaluation ===
Land & Water Australia's Board and Innovation Manager commissioned an excellent triple bottom line research evaluation that sought to report on the return on investment of projects and programs. The TBL-ROI method was described by Chudleigh et al. (2006) and further developed (Schofield et al., 2007) before being rapidly adopted in a rolling evaluation of Australia's agricultural research and development investment of about A$441m per year.
