= Phyllocnistis xenia =

Scientific classification
- Domain: Eukaryota
- Kingdom: Animalia
- Phylum: Arthropoda
- Class: Insecta
- Order: Lepidoptera
- Family: Gracillariidae
- Genus: Phyllocnistis
- Species: P. xenia

Binomial name
- Phyllocnistis xenia M. Hering, 1936

Species of moth

Phyllocnistis xenia is a moth of the family Gracillariidae. It is found from Great Britain to Bulgaria and from Poland to the Iberian Peninsula and Italy.

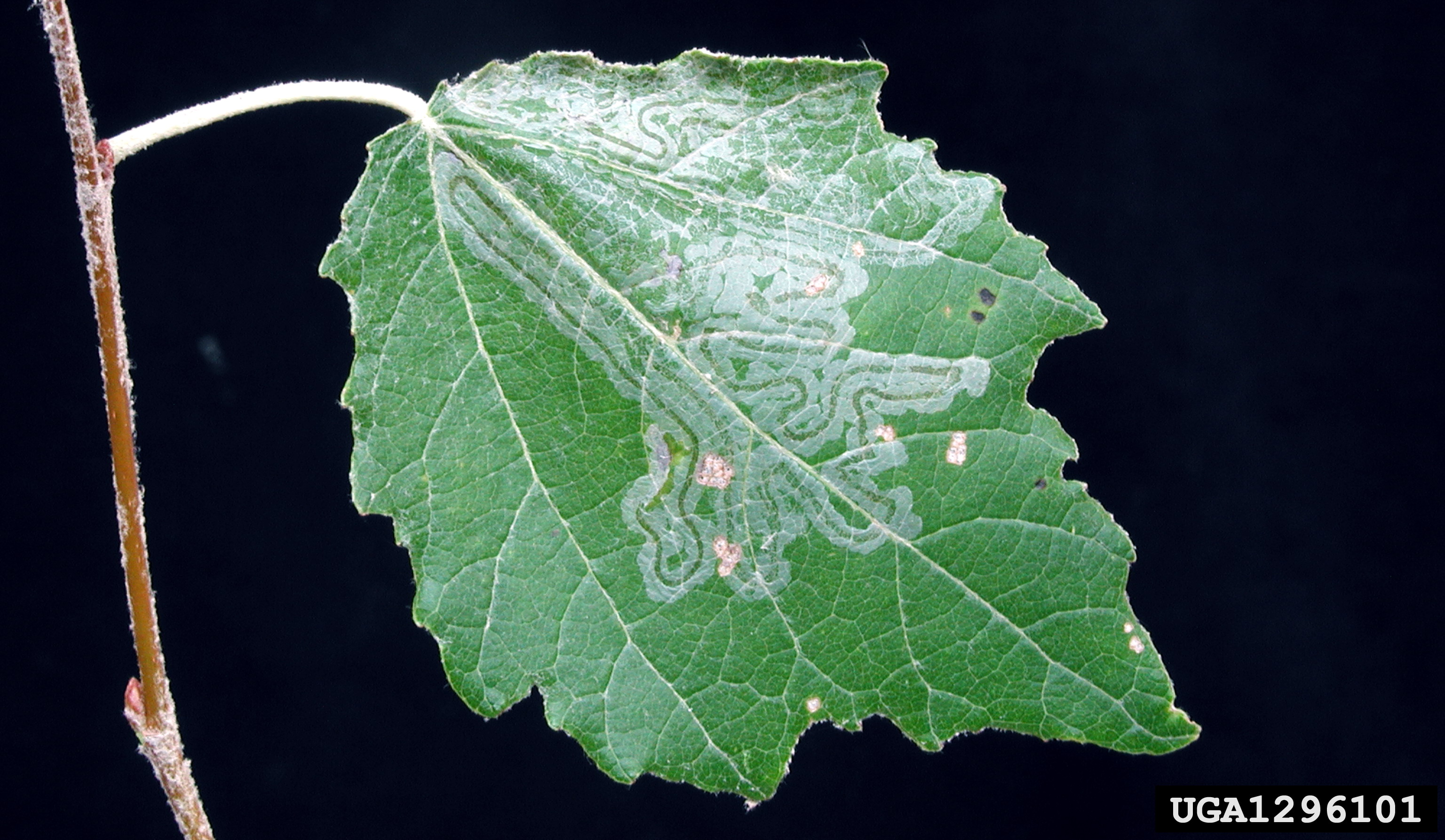
Damage

The wingspan is 6–7 mm. Adults are on wing from July to August and again from September to May in two generations.

The larvae feed on Populus alba, Populus canescens and Populus tremula. They mine the leaves of their host plant.

== Taxonomy ==
Phyllocnistis xenia might be a synonym of Phyllocnistis labyrinthella.
