= White poplar =

White poplar is a common name used to refer to several trees in the genus Populus, including:

- Populus alba, native to Eurasia
- Populus grandidentata, bigtooth aspen
- Populus tremuloides, American aspen
- Populus tomentosa, Chinese white poplar
