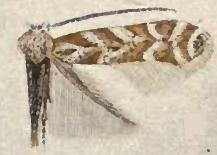

Scientific classification
- Domain: Eukaryota
- Kingdom: Animalia
- Phylum: Arthropoda
- Class: Insecta
- Order: Lepidoptera
- Family: Gracillariidae
- Genus: Phyllonorycter
- Species: P. apparella

Binomial name
- Phyllonorycter apparella (Herrich-Schäffer, 1855)

Synonyms
- Tinea apparella Herrich-Schaffer, 1855; Lithocolletis apparella; Lithocolletis atomariella Zeller, 1875; Lithocolletis populiella Busck, 1903; Lithocolletis tremuloidiella Braun, 1908; Lithocolletis salicifoliella Martin, 1956; Lithocolletis ontario Freeman, 1970; Phyllonorycter atomariella; Phyllonorycter ontario; Phyllonorycter tremuloidiella

= Phyllonorycter apparella =

Species of moth

Phyllonorycter apparella, the aspen leaf blotch miner moth, is a moth of the family Gracillariidae. It is found in most of Europe (except the British Isles, the Iberian Peninsula, the Balkan Peninsula, and the Mediterranean islands). It is also present in Turkey and North America.

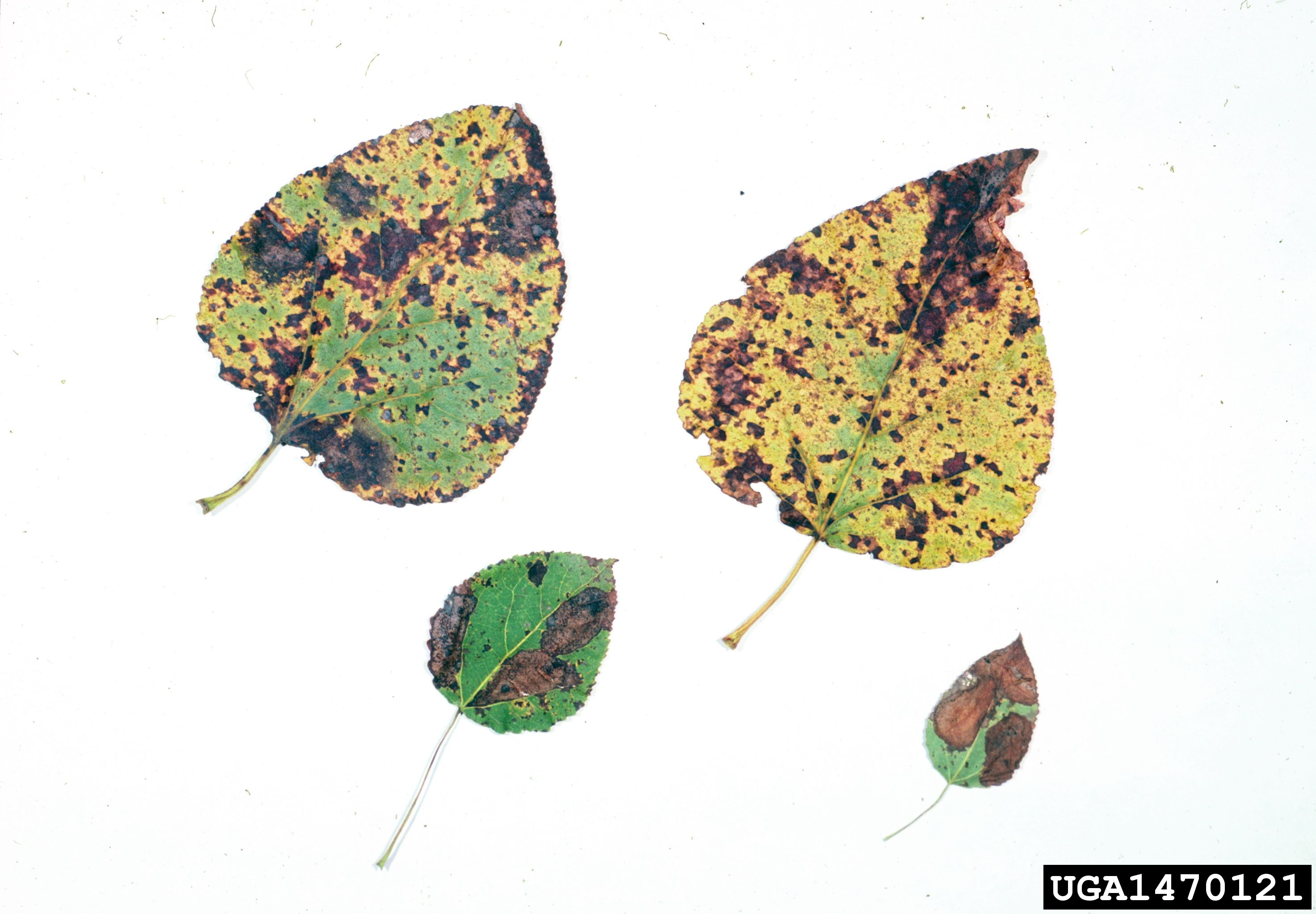

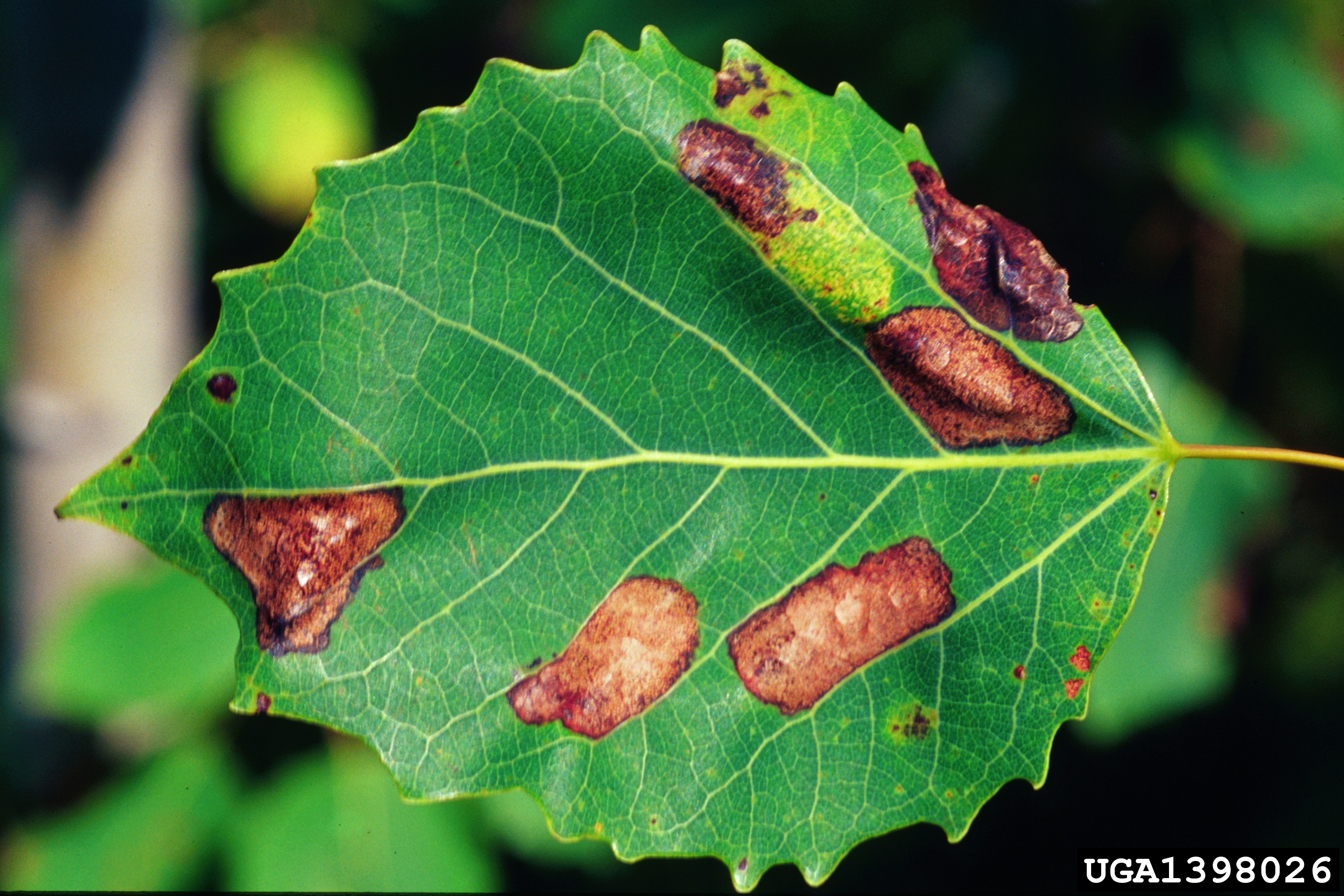

The wingspan is 8.5–10 mm. There is one generation per year.

The larvae feed on Populus canescens and Populus tremula. They mine the leaves of their host plant. Each mine has one larva, and each leaf may have up to 26 mines. The frass is clumped in a corner of the mine. Pupation takes place in the mine in a white cocoon.
