= Aspen =

Common name for certain tree species in the Populus genus

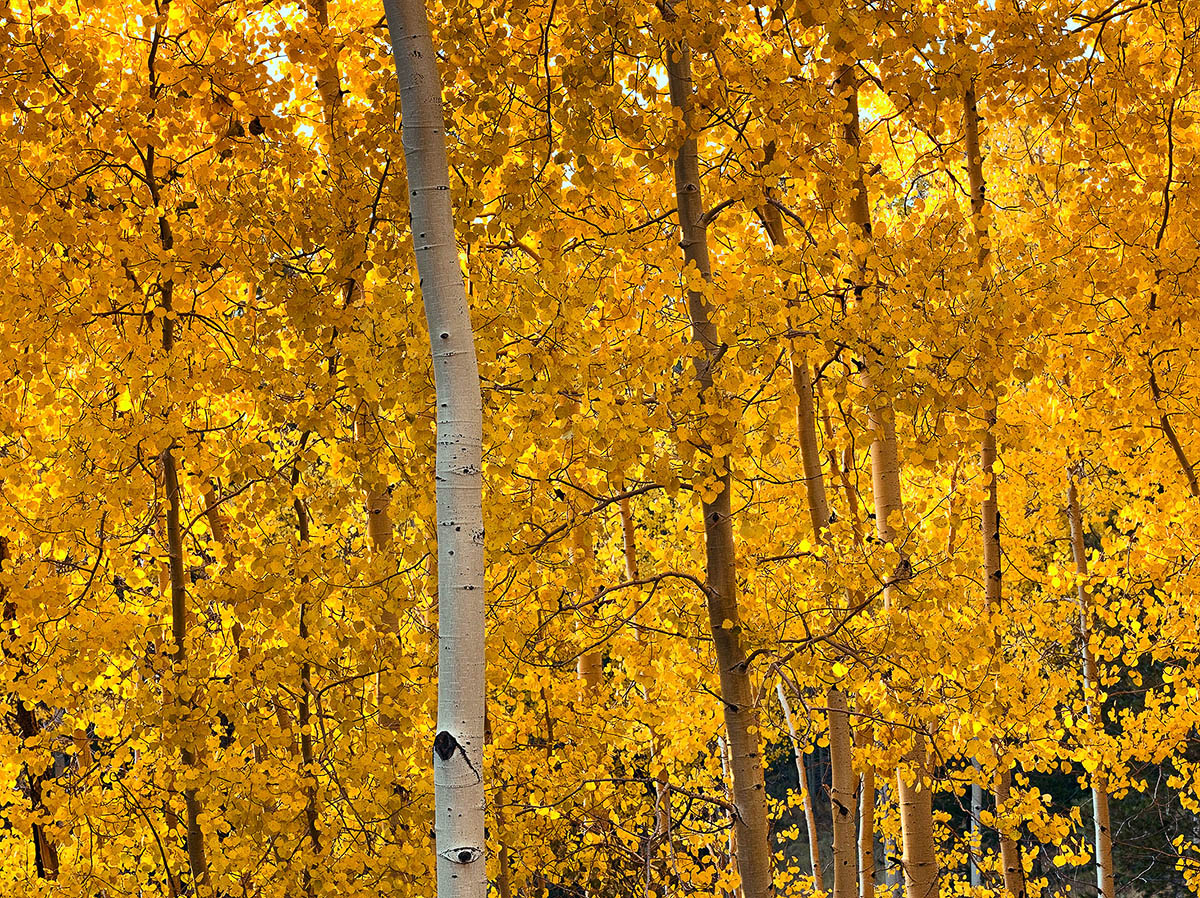
Quaking aspens, Populus tremuloides

Aspen is a common name for certain tree species in the Populus sect. Populus, of the Populus (poplar) genus. Aspens were referred to as "asps" in earlier forms of English.

== Species ==
These species are called aspens:

- Populus adenopoda – Chinese aspen (China, south of P. tremula)
- Populus davidiana – Korean aspen (Eastern Asia)
- Populus grandidentata – Bigtooth aspen (eastern North America, south of P. tremuloides)
- Populus sieboldii – Japanese aspen (Japan)
- Populus tremula – Eurasian aspen (northern Europe and Asia)
- Populus tremuloides – Quaking aspen or trembling aspen (northern and western North America)

== Habitat and longevity ==
The quaking of the leaves of the quaking aspen

Aspen trees are all native to cold regions with cool summers, in the north of the northern hemisphere, extending south at high-altitude areas such as mountains or high plains. They are all medium-sized deciduous trees reaching 15–30 m (50–100 ft) tall. In North America, the aspen is referred to as quaking aspen or trembling aspen because the leaves "quake" or tremble in the wind. This is due to their flattened petioles which reduce aerodynamic drag on the trunk and branches.

Aspen trees near Crested Butte, Colorado

Aspens typically grow in environments that are otherwise dominated by coniferous tree species, and which are often lacking other large deciduous tree species. Aspens have evolved several adaptations that aid their survival in such environments. One is the flattened leaf petiole, which reduces aerodynamic drag during high winds and decreases the likelihood of trunk or branch damage. Dropping leaves in the winter (like most but not all other deciduous plants) also helps to prevent damage from heavy winter snow. Additionally, the bark is photosynthetic, meaning that growth is still possible after the leaves have been dropped. The bark also contains lenticels that serve as pores for gas exchange, in which their respiratory function resembles that of the stomata on leaves.

Aspens are also aided by the rhizomatic nature of their root systems. Most aspens grow in large clonal colonies, derived from a single seedling, and spread by means of root suckers; new stems in the colony may appear at up to 30–40 m (100–130 ft) from the parent tree. Each individual tree can live for 40–150 years above ground, but the root system of the colony is long-lived. In some cases, this is for thousands of years, sending up new trunks as the older trunks die off above ground. For this reason, it is considered to be an indicator of ancient woodlands. One such colony in Utah, given the nickname of "Pando", has been estimated as being 80,000 years of age; if validated, this would likely make it the oldest living colony of aspens. Some aspen colonies become very large with time, spreading about 1 m (3 ft) per year, eventually covering many hectares. They are able to survive forest fires, because the roots are below the heat of the fire, and new sprouts appear after the fire burns out. The high stem turnover rate combined with the clonal growth leads to proliferation in aspen colonies. The high stem turnover regime supports a diverse herbaceous understory.

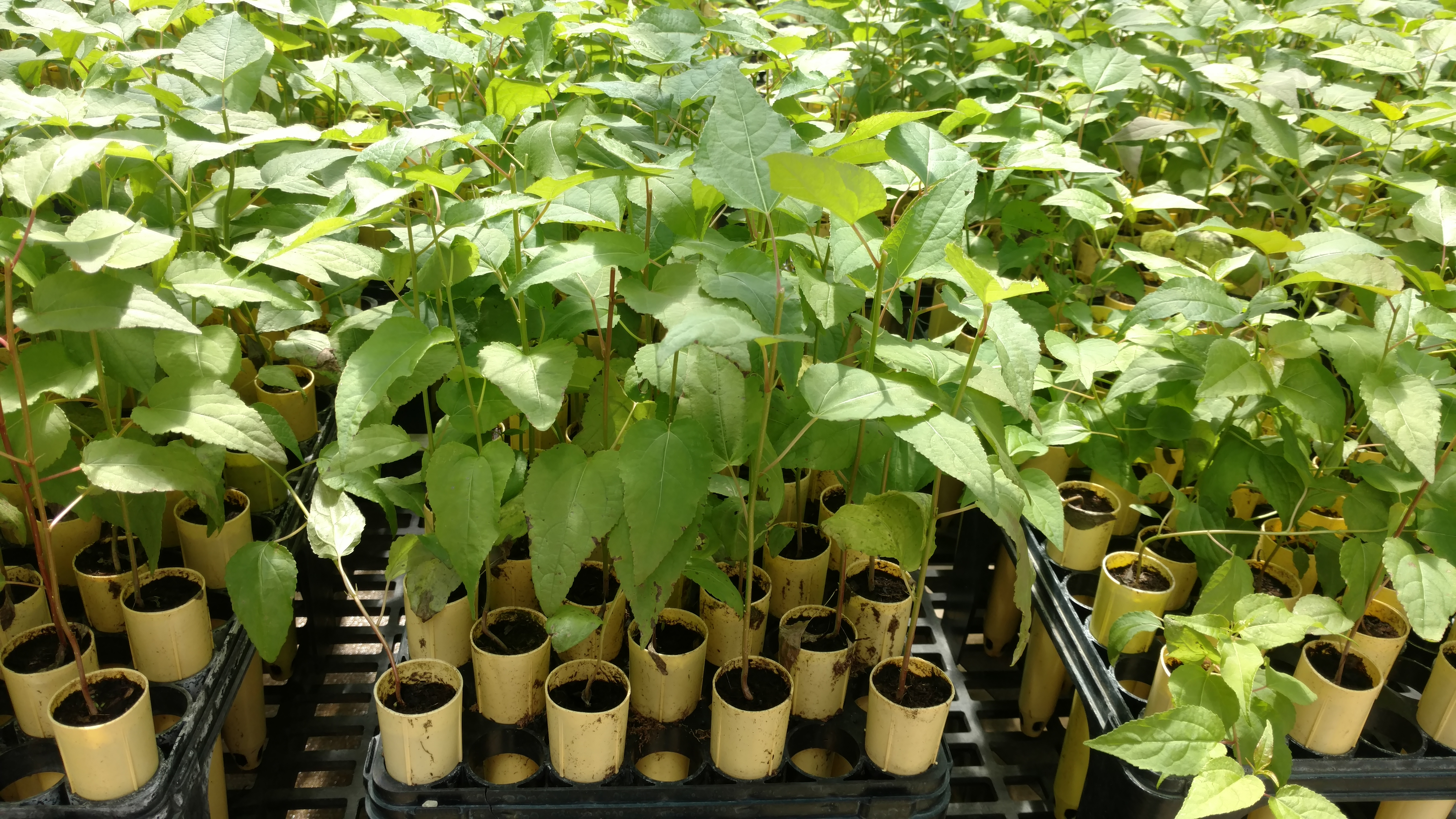
Aspen seedlings in a nursery

Aspen seedlings do not thrive in the shade, and it is difficult for seedlings to establish in an already mature aspen stand. Fire indirectly benefits aspen trees, since it allows the saplings to flourish in open sunlight in the burned landscape, devoid of other competing tree species. Aspens have increased in popularity as a forestry cultivation species, mostly because of their fast growth rate and ability to regenerate from sprouts. This lowers the cost of reforestation after harvesting since no planting or sowing is required.

Aspen populations have been declining in some areas; this "sudden aspen death" has been attributed to factors as diverse as climate change exacerbating drought and modifying precipitation patterns; recruitment failure from herbivory or grazing preventing new trees from coming up after old trees die; and to successional replacement by conifers due to fire suppression altering forest diversity and creating conditions where aspen may be at less of an advantage.

In contrast with many trees, aspen bark is base-rich, meaning aspens are important hosts for bryophytes and act as food plants for the larvae of butterfly (Lepidoptera) species.

Young aspen bark is an important seasonal forage for the European hare and other animals in early spring. Aspen is also a preferred food of the European beaver. Elk, deer, and moose not only eat the leaves but also strip the bark with their front teeth.

== Image gallery ==
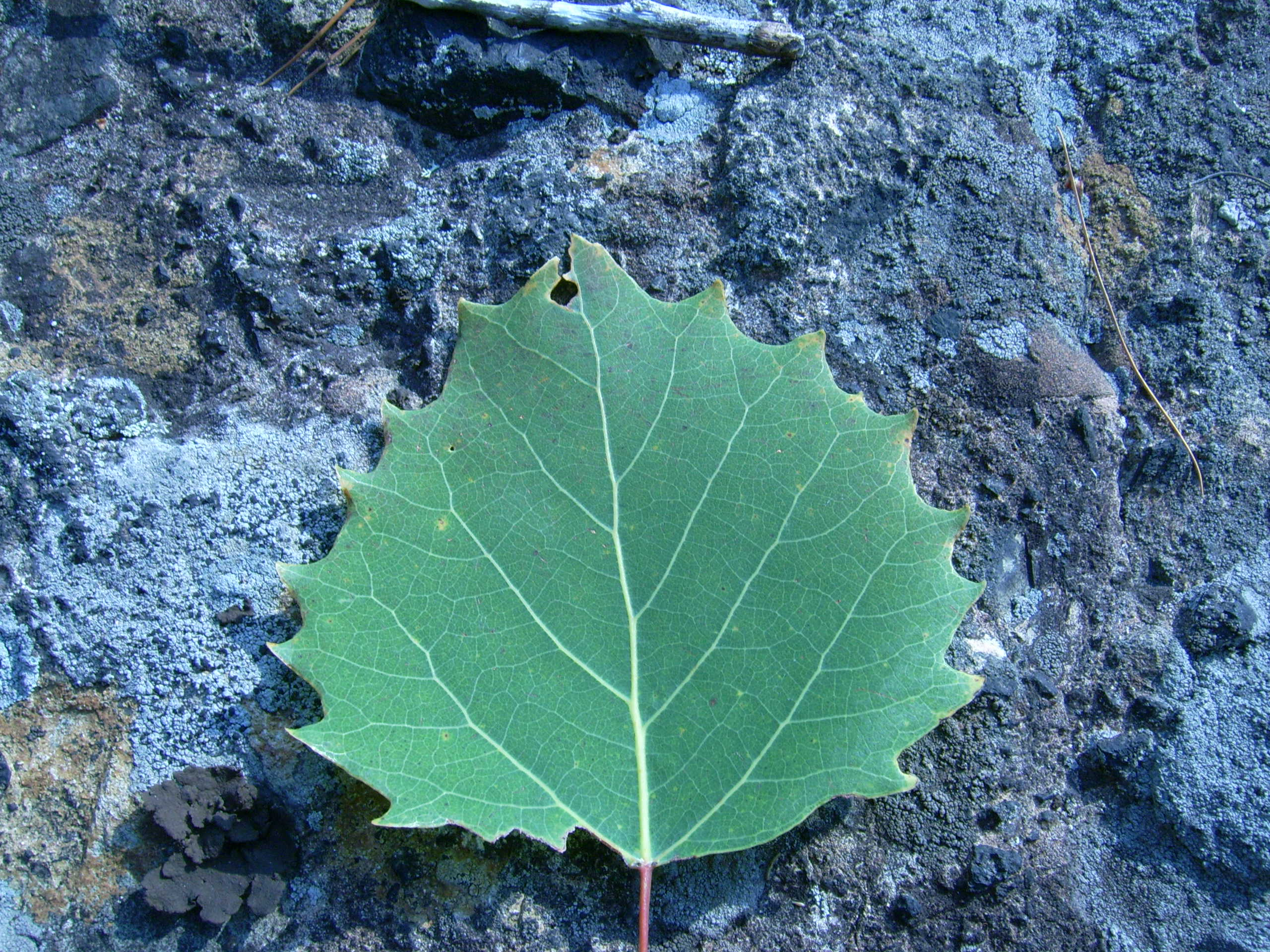
Leaf of Populus grandidentata.

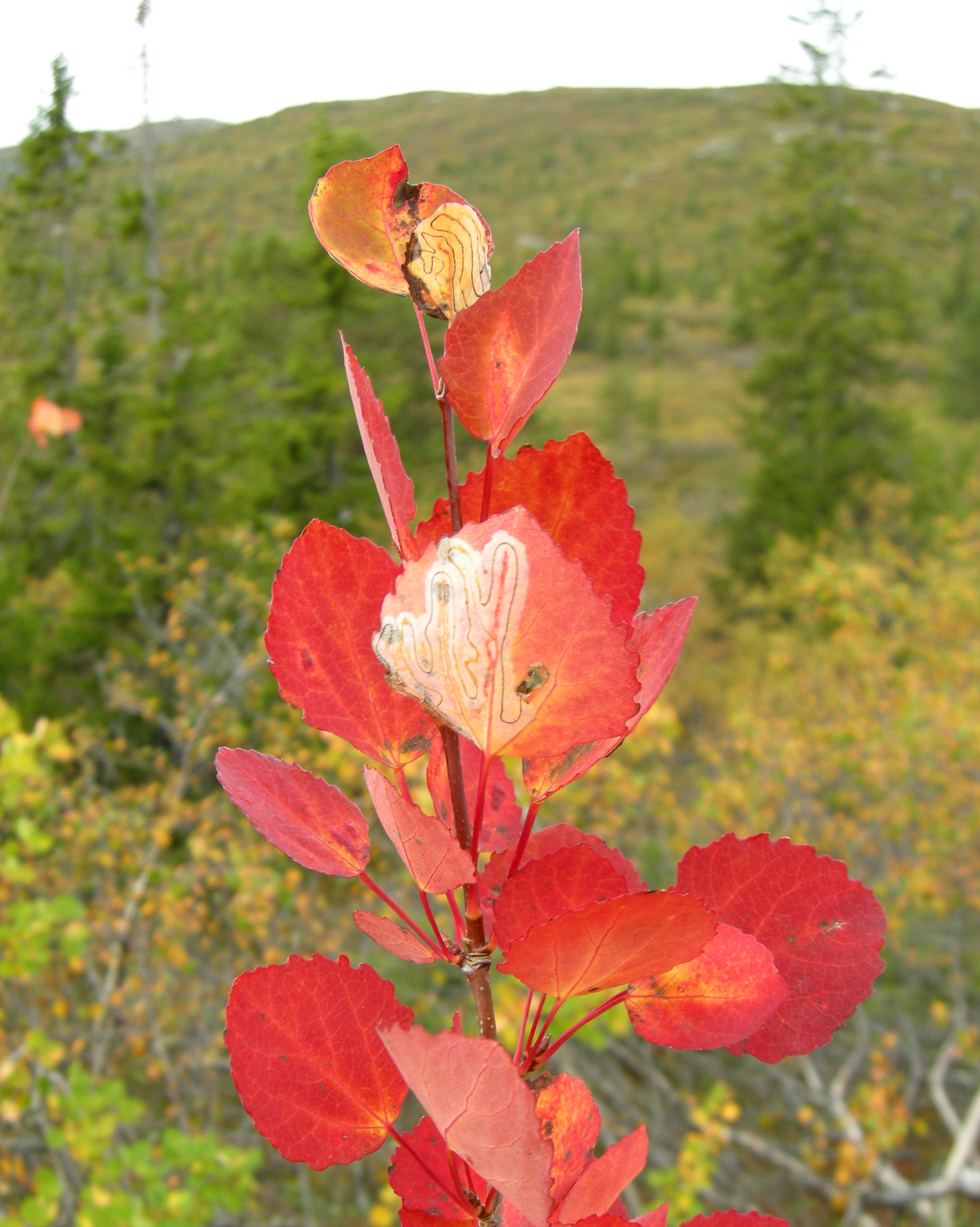
Autumn colour of Populus tremula. (leaf miner fly burrows are visible.)

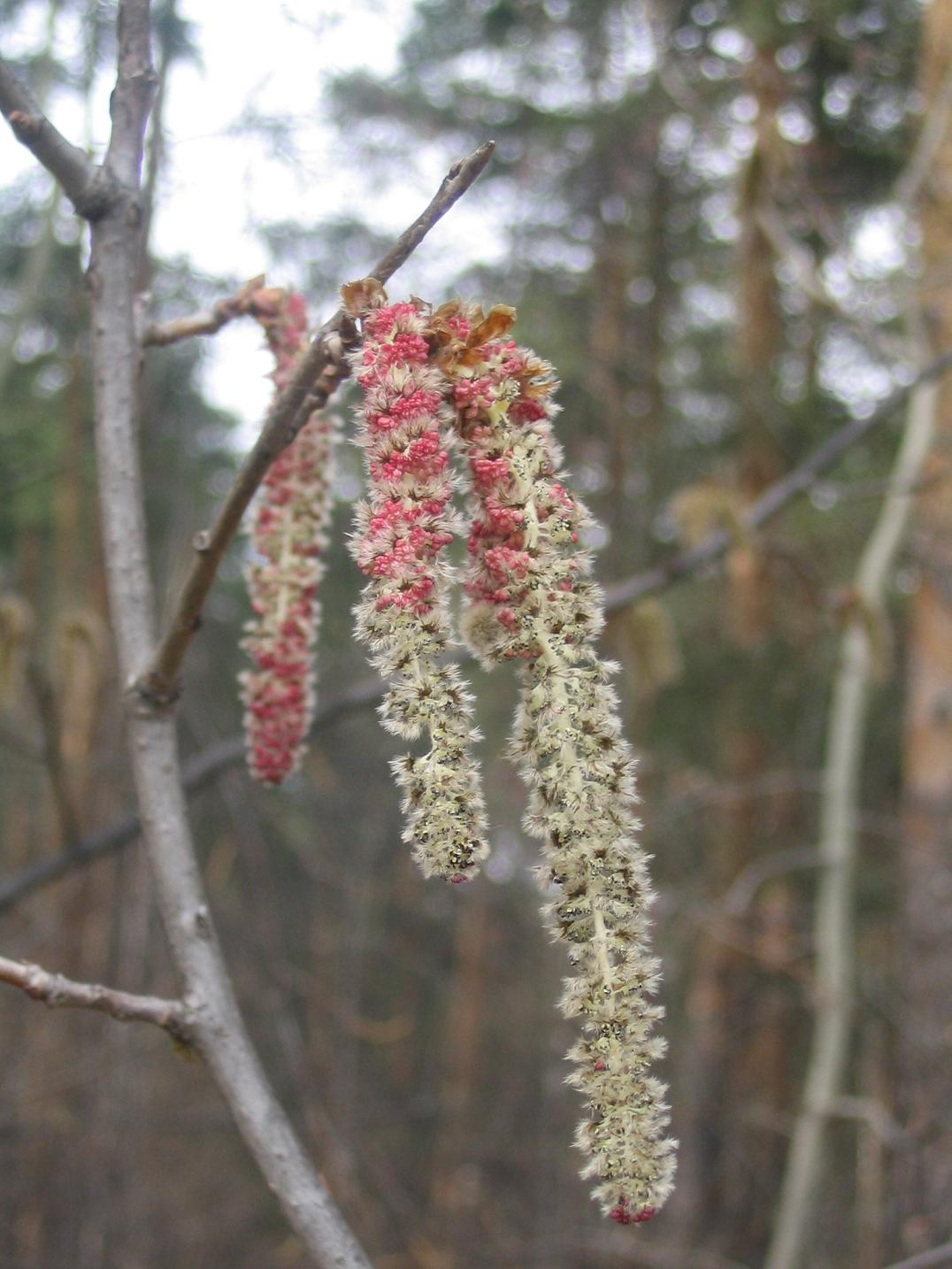
Male flowers (catkin) of Populus tremula.

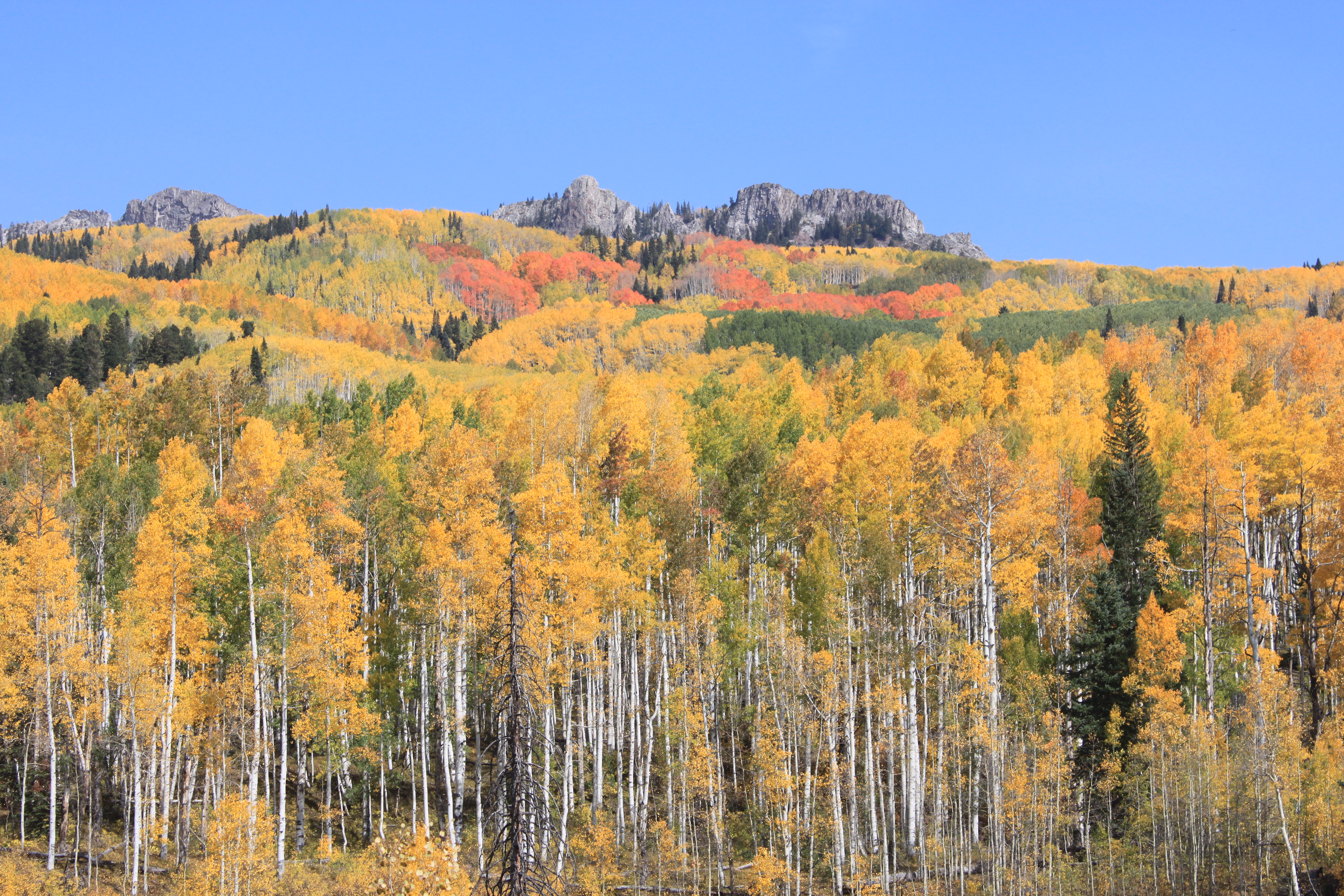
Aspen grove in fall, at the Kebler Pass in Colorado, USA.

== Uses ==
Aspen wood is white and soft, but fairly strong, and has low flammability. It has a number of uses, notably for making matches and paper where its low flammability makes it safer to use than most other woods. Shredded aspen wood is used for packing and stuffing, sometimes called excelsior (wood wool). Aspen flakes are the most common species of wood used to make oriented strand boards. It is also a popular animal bedding, since it lacks the phenols associated with pine and juniper, which are thought to cause respiratory system ailments in some animals. Heat-treated aspen is a popular material for the interiors of saunas. While standing trees sometimes tend to rot from the heart outward, the dry timber weathers very well, becoming silvery-grey and resistant to rotting and warping, and has traditionally been used for rural construction in the northwestern regions of Russia (especially for roofing, in the form of thin slats).
