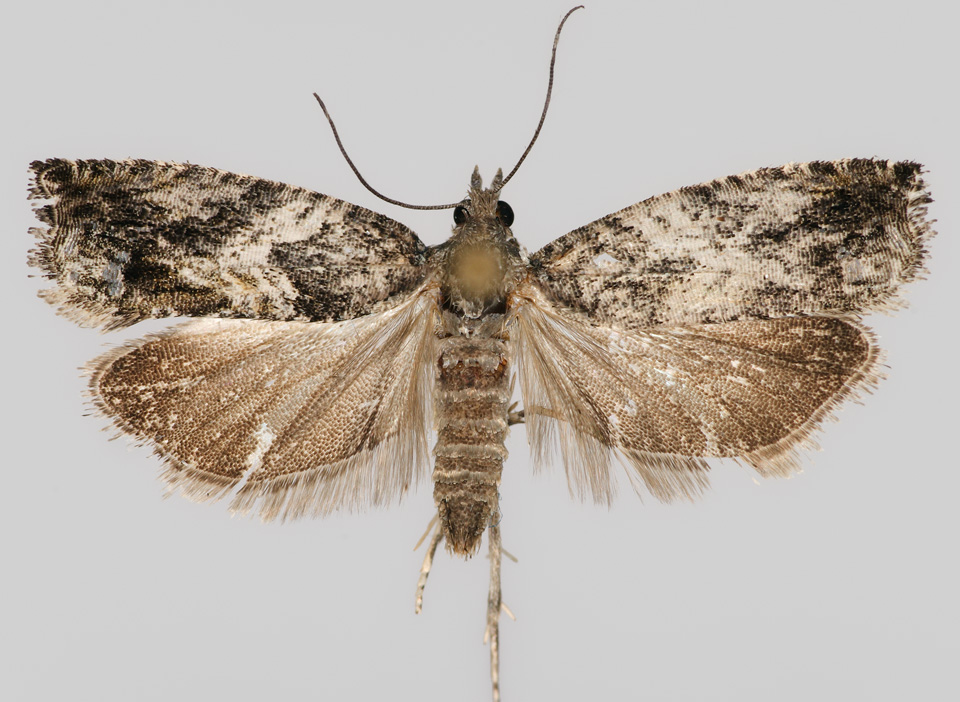

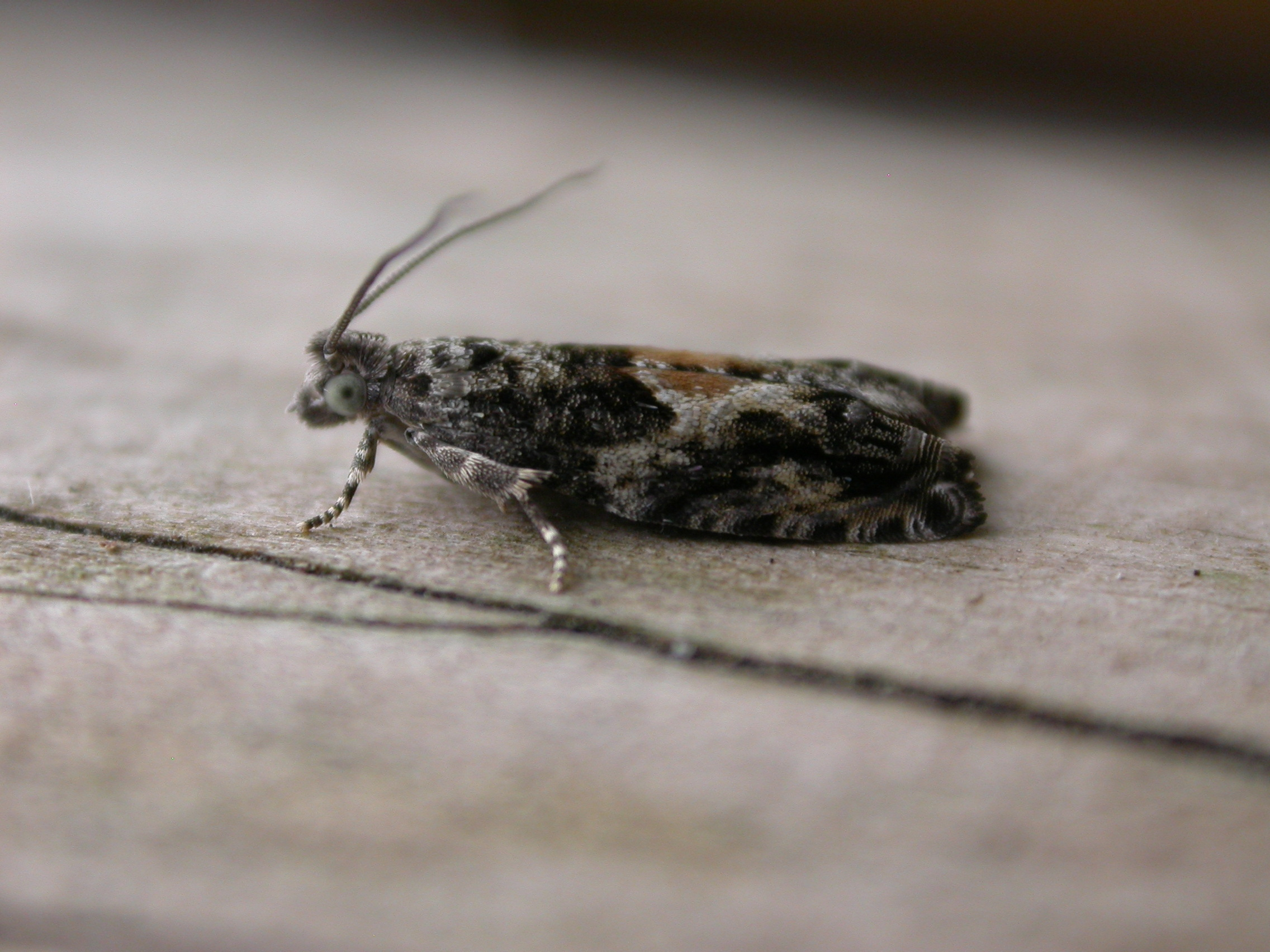

Scientific classification
- Kingdom: Animalia
- Phylum: Arthropoda
- Clade: Pancrustacea
- Class: Insecta
- Order: Lepidoptera
- Family: Tortricidae
- Genus: Epinotia
- Species: E. nisella

Binomial name
- Epinotia nisella (Clerck, 1759)

Synonyms
- List: Phalaena nisella Clerck, 1759; Epiblema nisella ab. albodecorana Krulikowsky, 1908; Tortrix anana Schrank, 1802; Pyralis boeberana Fabricius, 1787; Eucosma nisella ab. brunneana Dufrane, 1930; Steganoptycha cinerana Stephens, 1829; Tortrix cinereana Haworth, [1811]; Tortrix cuspidana Haworth, [1811]; Tortrix decorana Hubner, [1818-1819]; Epiblema nisella ab. dorsimaculana Klemensiewicz, 1906; Epiblema nisella ab. fulminana Krulikowsky, 1908; Tortrix lepidana Frolich, 1828; Grapholitha nisana Guenee, 1845; Phalaena pavonana Donovan, [1793]; Tortrix petrana Hubner, [1811-1813]; Tortrix rhombifasciana Haworth, [1811]; Tortrix rubiana Haworth, [1811]; Tortrix siliceana Hubner, [1811-1813]; Tortrix stictana Haworth, [1811]

= Epinotia nisella =

Species of moth

Epinotia nisella is a moth of the family Tortricidae which is found in the Palearctic, Europe and North America. It was first described by Carl Alexander Clerck in 1759.

== Life cycle ==
The wingspan is about 12–17 mm. The forewings are grey, more or less mixed with white, slightly ferruginous-tinged, irregularly strigulated with blackish-grey. The basal patch is darker, its edge more blackish and acutely angulated in the middle. There often is a ferruginous or red-brown flattened-triangular dorsal blotch distal to this. The central fascia is slender, irregular, again somewhat darker. The edges of the ocellus, and sometimes a stria above them leaden-metallic. Sometimes the whole forewing is suffused with ferruginous except the basal and terminal patches; termen sinuate. The hindwings are light fuscous, terminally dark fuscous. The larva is pale green; head dark brown.

Adults are on wing in July and August and during the day can be found on the foliage or amongst lichen on the tree trunks of the larval foodplants. When disturbed it flies erratically to another resting place and in the evening comes to light.

=== Ova ===
Eggs are laid on poplars (Populus species) and willows (Salix species), especially rough-leaved species. They include aspen (P. tremula), black poplar (P. nigra), grey poplar (Populus × canescens), grey willow (S. cinerea) and goat willow (S. caprea).

=== Larva ===
The larvae feed from April to June on the catkins or between a sandwich of two leaves. (Note: For a description of early and late instars see UKmoths)

=== Pupa ===
Pupae are light brown and can be found in the larval habitation or in a flimsy, brownish, silken cocoon amongst leaf litter in June and July.

== Distribution ==
It is found in most of Europe (except Iceland, Portugal, Ukraine, and the central part of the Balkan Peninsula), east to the Near East and the eastern part of the Palearctic realm. It is also found in North America, including Massachusetts and Minnesota in the United States. In Canada, it is found from Newfoundland to British Columbia.
