= Streptomyces populi =

Scientific classification
- Domain: Bacteria
- Kingdom: Bacillati
- Phylum: Actinomycetota
- Class: Actinomycetia
- Order: Streptomycetales
- Family: Streptomycetaceae
- Genus: Streptomyces
- Species: S. populi

Binomial name
- Streptomyces populi Wang et al. 2018

Type strain
- A249

Species of bacterium

Streptomyces populi is an endophytic bacterium species from the genus of Streptomyces which has been isolated from the stem of the tree Populus adenopoda from the Mount Qingcheng in China.

== See also ==
- List of Streptomyces species
