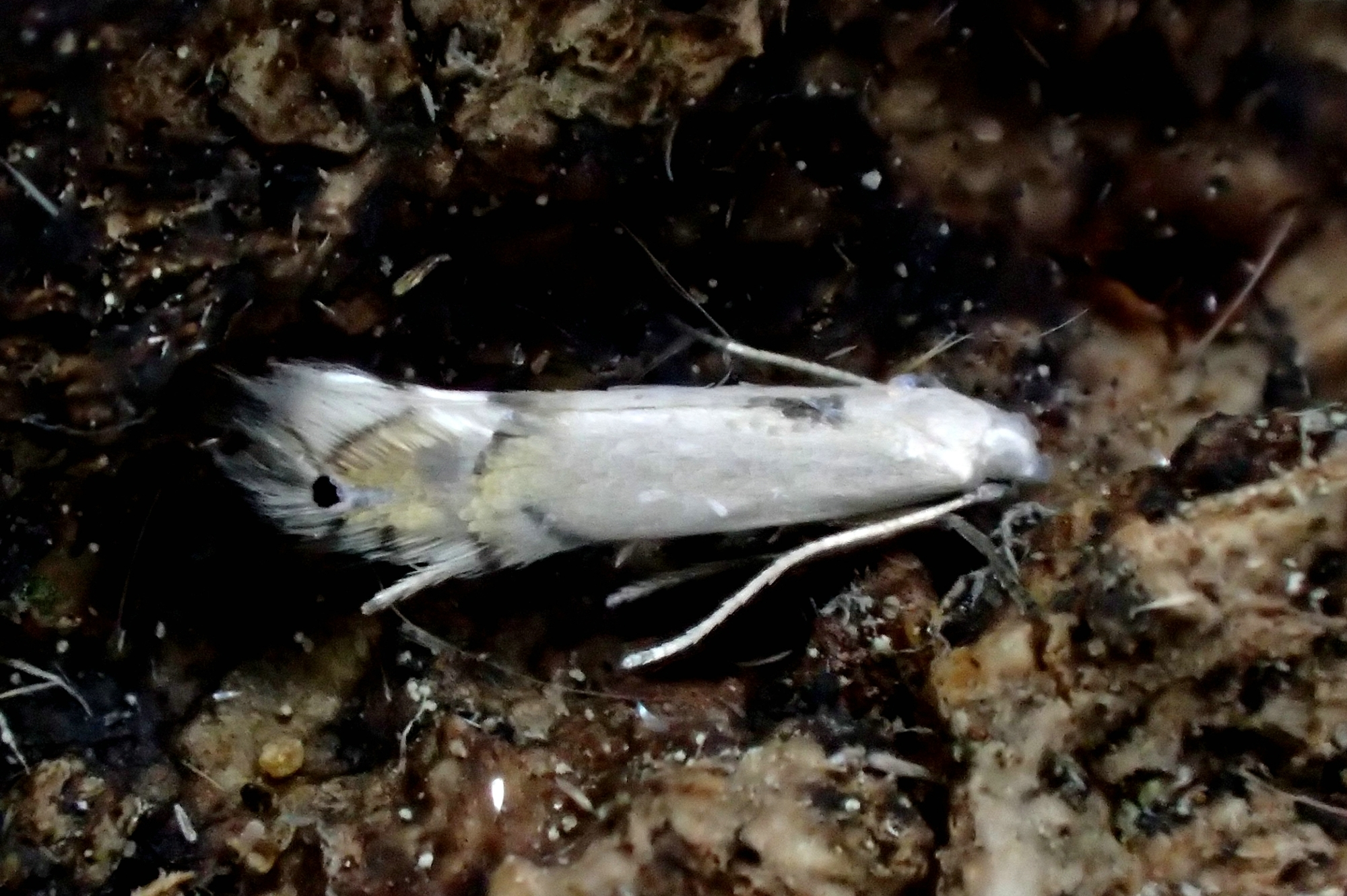

Scientific classification
- Kingdom: Animalia
- Phylum: Arthropoda
- Clade: Pancrustacea
- Class: Insecta
- Order: Lepidoptera
- Family: Gracillariidae
- Genus: Phyllocnistis
- Species: P. labyrinthella

Binomial name
- Phyllocnistis labyrinthella (Bjerkander, 1790)

Synonyms
- Phyllocnistis sorhageniella (Lüders, 1900)

= Phyllocnistis labyrinthella =

Species of moth

Phyllocnistis labyrinthella is a moth of the family Gracillariidae. It is found in most of continental Europe, except Italy, the Mediterranean Islands and parts of the Balkan Peninsula.

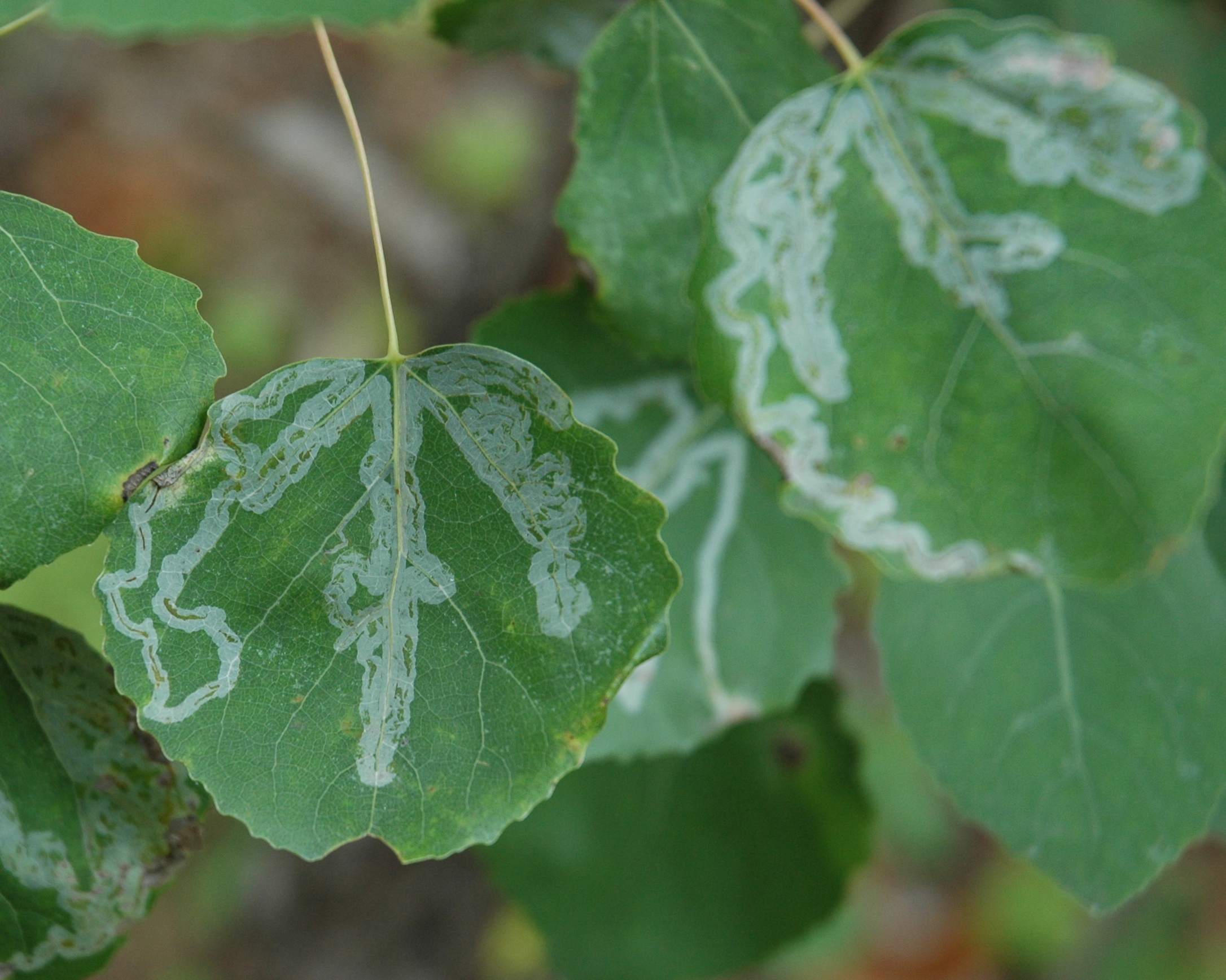
Mines of Phyllocnistis labyrinthella

The wingspan is 6–7 mm.

The larvae mine the leaves of poplars such as Populus alba and Populus tremula.
