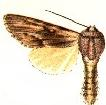

Scientific classification
- Kingdom: Animalia
- Phylum: Arthropoda
- Clade: Pancrustacea
- Class: Insecta
- Order: Lepidoptera
- Superfamily: Noctuoidea
- Family: Noctuidae
- Genus: Acronicta
- Species: A. lanceolaria

Binomial name
- Acronicta lanceolaria Grote, 1875

= Acronicta lanceolaria =

Species of moth

Acronicta lanceolaria, the lanceolate dagger moth or pointed dagger, is a moth of the family Noctuidae. The species was first described by Augustus Radcliffe Grote in 1875. It is found in North America, from Nova Scotia to British Columbia. It is listed as a species of special concern and believed extirpated in the US state of Connecticut.

Adults are on wing in early June in one generation.

Reported larval hosts include Populus grandidentata, Salix and Rubus.
