= Ackley Wildlife Area =

Protected area in Wisconsin, US

- Location within Wisconsin Location within the United States
- Location: Langlade County, Wisconsin
- Nearest city: Antigo, Wisconsin
- Coordinates: 45.144409°N 89.403356°W
- Area: 4,386 acres (17.75 km^{2})
- Established: 1951
- Governing body: Wisconsin Department of Natural Resources

Ackley Wildlife Area is a tract of protected land located in southern Langlade County, Wisconsin, managed by the Wisconsin Department of Natural Resources (WDNR).

== History ==
The earliest logging activities in the general vicinity first occurred in the late 1800s. In the early 1900s, deforestation and farming attempts had made the area particularly susceptible to wildfires, all of which reduced the once great tree cover to grasses, shrubs and aspen. These new growth flora allowed for the water table to rise, and subsequently, stocks of sharp-tailed grouse and other similar fauna rose. The Ackley Wildlife Area was founded in 1951 to allow for the management of hunting in the property.
