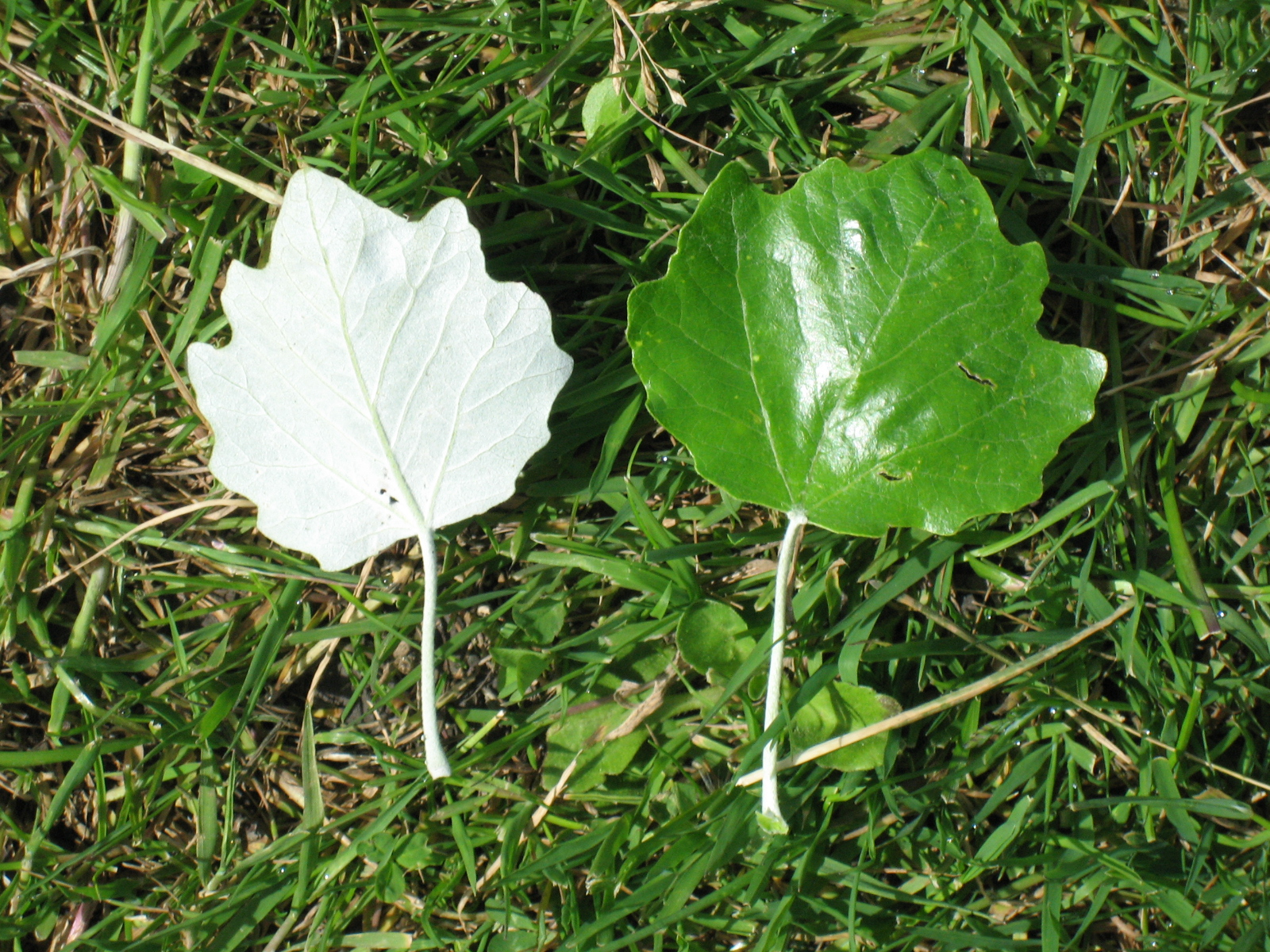
- Leaves of Populus alba, the type species of the section

Scientific classification
- Kingdom: Plantae
- Clade: Tracheophytes
- Clade: Angiosperms
- Clade: Eudicots
- Clade: Rosids
- Order: Malpighiales
- Family: Salicaceae
- Genus: Populus
- Section: Populus sect. Populus

Species
- See text

Synonyms
- P. sect. Leuce Duby

= Populus sect. Populus =

Section of plants

Populus section Populus, of the Populus (poplar) genus, includes the aspen trees and the white poplar Populus alba. The five typical aspens are all native to cold regions with cool summers, in the north of the Northern Hemisphere, extending south at high altitudes in the mountains. The white poplar, by contrast, is native to warmer regions, with hot, dry summers. These trees are all medium-sized deciduous trees ranging 15–30 metres (49–98 ft) tall.

All of the species in section Populus typically grow in large clonal colonies derived from a single seedling, and spreading by means of root suckers; new stems in the colony may appear at up to 30–40 metres from the previous trees. Each individual tree can live for 40–150 years above ground, but the root system of the colony is long-lived, sending up new trunks as the older trunks die off above ground, spreading about a metre per year, sometimes eventually covering many hectares. They are able to survive forest fires because the roots are below the heat of the fire, and new sprouts can grow from the roots. One colony of American aspen (P. tremuloides) in Utah, given the nickname of "Pando", has been estimated to be 80,000 years old (disputed), making it possibly the oldest living colony of aspens.

== Species ==
Some of the species in the section are:

- Populus adenopoda – Chinese aspen (China, south of P. tremula)
- Populus alba – white poplar (northwest Africa, southern Europe, east to central Asia)
- Populus brandegeei - Baja poplar (northwestern Mexico)
- Populus davidiana – Korean aspen (Korea)
- Populus grandidentata – bigtooth aspen (eastern North America, south of P. tremuloides)
- Populus koreana – Korean poplar (Korea)
- Populus ningshanica
- Populus qiongdaoensis
- Populus rotundifolia
- Populus sieboldii – Japanese aspen (Japan)
- Populus simonii – Simon's poplar (Korea)
- Populus suaveolens – Manchurian poplar (Korea)
- Populus tomentosa, Chinese white poplar (China)
- Populus tremula – Eurasian aspen (northern Europe and Asia)
- Populus tremuloides – American aspen (northern and western North America)
- Populus wulianensis

Natural hybrids between species in the section include:

- Populus × canescens: grey poplar, P. alba × P. tremula
- Populus × hopeiensis: P. davidiana × P. tomentosa
- Populus × pseudotomentosa: P. adenopoda × P. tomentosa

== Ecology ==
Aspens do not thrive very well in the shade, and it is difficult for aspen seedlings to grow in an already mature aspen stand. Fire indirectly benefits aspen trees, since it allows the saplings to flourish in open sunlight in the burned landscape. Lately, aspens have an increased popularity in forestry, mostly because of their fast growth rate and ability to regenerate from sprouts, making the reforestation after harvesting much cheaper, since no planting or sowing is required.

In contrast with many trees, aspen bark is base-rich, meaning that aspens are important hosts for bryophytes and act as food plants for the larvae of butterfly (Lepidoptera) species—see List of Lepidoptera that feed on poplars.

Young aspen bark is an important seasonal forage for the european hare and other animals in early spring. Aspen is also a tree of choice of the european beaver.

== Uses ==
Aspen wood is white and soft, but fairly strong, and has low flammability. It has a number of uses, notably for making matches and paper where its low flammability makes it safer to use than most other woods. Shredded aspen wood is used for packing and stuffing, sometimes called excelsior (wood wool). It is also a popular animal bedding, since it lacks the phenols associated with pine and juniper, which are thought to cause respiratory system ailments in some animals. Heat-treated aspen is a popular material for the interiors of a sauna. While standing trees sometimes tend to rot from the heart outward, the dry timber weathers very well, becoming silvery-grey and resistant to rotting and warping, and has traditionally been used for rural construction in the northwestern regions of Russia (especially for roofing, in the form of thin slats).

The Ojibwe used the inner bark of the trunk as a poultice, and the Cree ate the inner bark in the spring as a mild purgative.
