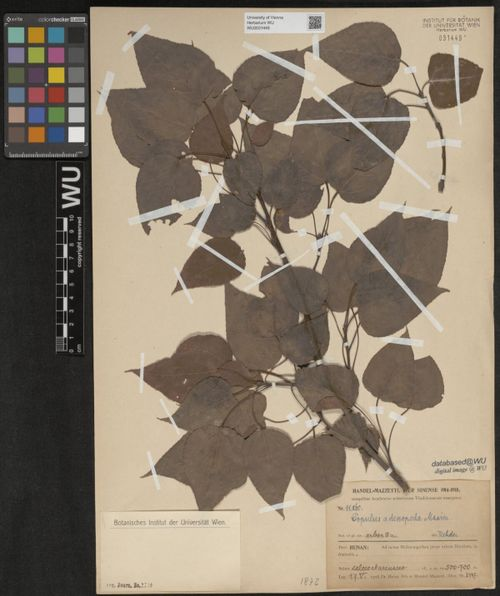

Scientific classification
- Kingdom: Plantae
- Clade: Tracheophytes
- Clade: Angiosperms
- Clade: Eudicots
- Clade: Rosids
- Order: Malpighiales
- Family: Salicaceae
- Genus: Populus
- Section: Populus sect. Populus
- Species: P. adenopoda

Binomial name
- Populus adenopoda Maximowicz

Synonyms
- Populus silvestrii Pamp.

= Populus adenopoda =

Species of tree

Populus adenopoda, known commonly as the Chinese aspen, is a species of poplar found in the subtropical regions of China. The trees can reach a maximum height of 30 metres, and occur on mountain slopes at elevations of 300–2500 metres. Wood from the trees is used in construction and furniture production, as well as timber, farm tools, and wood pulp.

It was first described in 1879 by Kark Maximovich.

Its native range is Assam, central & south-eastern China, Eastern Himalayas, Inner Mongolia, and Myanmar.

== Varieties ==
- Populus adenopoda var. adenopoda
- Populus adenopoda var. platyphylla C. Wang & S. L. Tung
