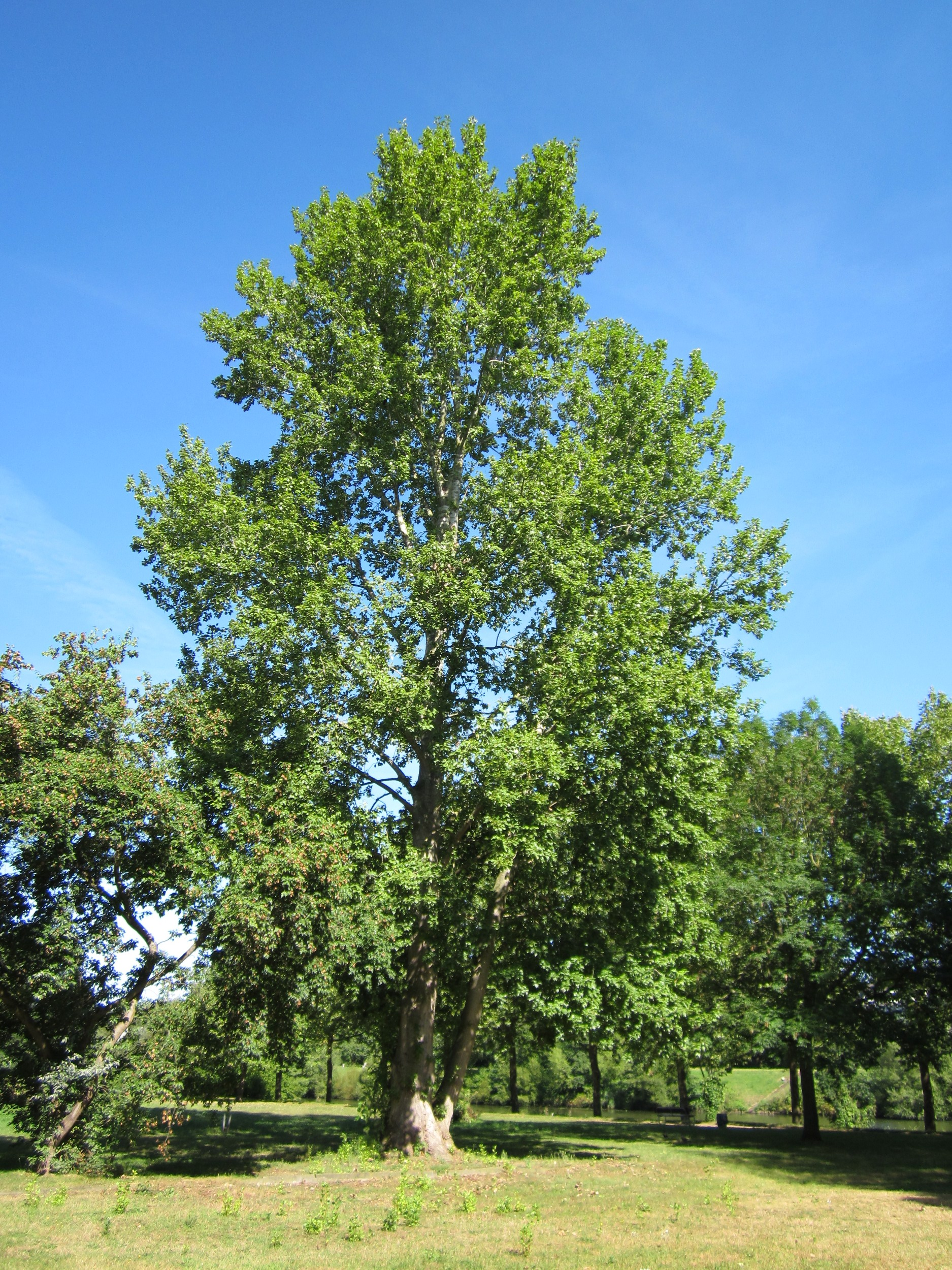

Scientific classification
- Kingdom: Plantae
- Clade: Tracheophytes
- Clade: Angiosperms
- Clade: Eudicots
- Clade: Rosids
- Order: Malpighiales
- Family: Salicaceae
- Genus: Populus
- Section: Populus sect. Populus
- Species: P. × canescens

Binomial name
- Populus × canescens (Aiton) Sm.

Synonyms
- Populus alba var. bachofenii (Wierzb. ex Rchb.) Wesm.; Populus alba var. canescens Aiton; Populus × bachofenii Wierzb. ex Rchb.; Populus × hybrida Rchb.

= Populus × canescens =

Nothospecies of plant

Populus × canescens, the grey poplar, is a hybrid between Populus alba (white poplar) and P. tremula (common aspen). It is intermediate between its parents, with a thin grey downy coating on the leaves, which are much less deeply lobed than the leaves of P. alba. It is a very vigorous tree with marked hybrid vigour, reaching 40 metres (130 feet) tall and with a trunk diameter over 1.5 m (5 ft) – much larger than either of its parents. Most trees in cultivation are male, but female trees occur naturally and some of these are also propagated.

== Taxonomy ==
In 1789, William Aiton described the grey poplar as a variety of Populus alba, P. alba var. canescens. In 1804, James Edward Smith raised it to a full species, P. canescens. He described differences between the leaves of the two taxa: P. alba has lobed leaves with snow-white ("niveus") undersides, whereas P. canescens has wavy-edged leaves with hoary ("incanus") undersides. Later authors sometimes noted the possibility that the grey poplar was a hybrid. It is now considered to be a hybrid between P. alba and P. tremula, so the scientific name is written with the hybrid symbol.
