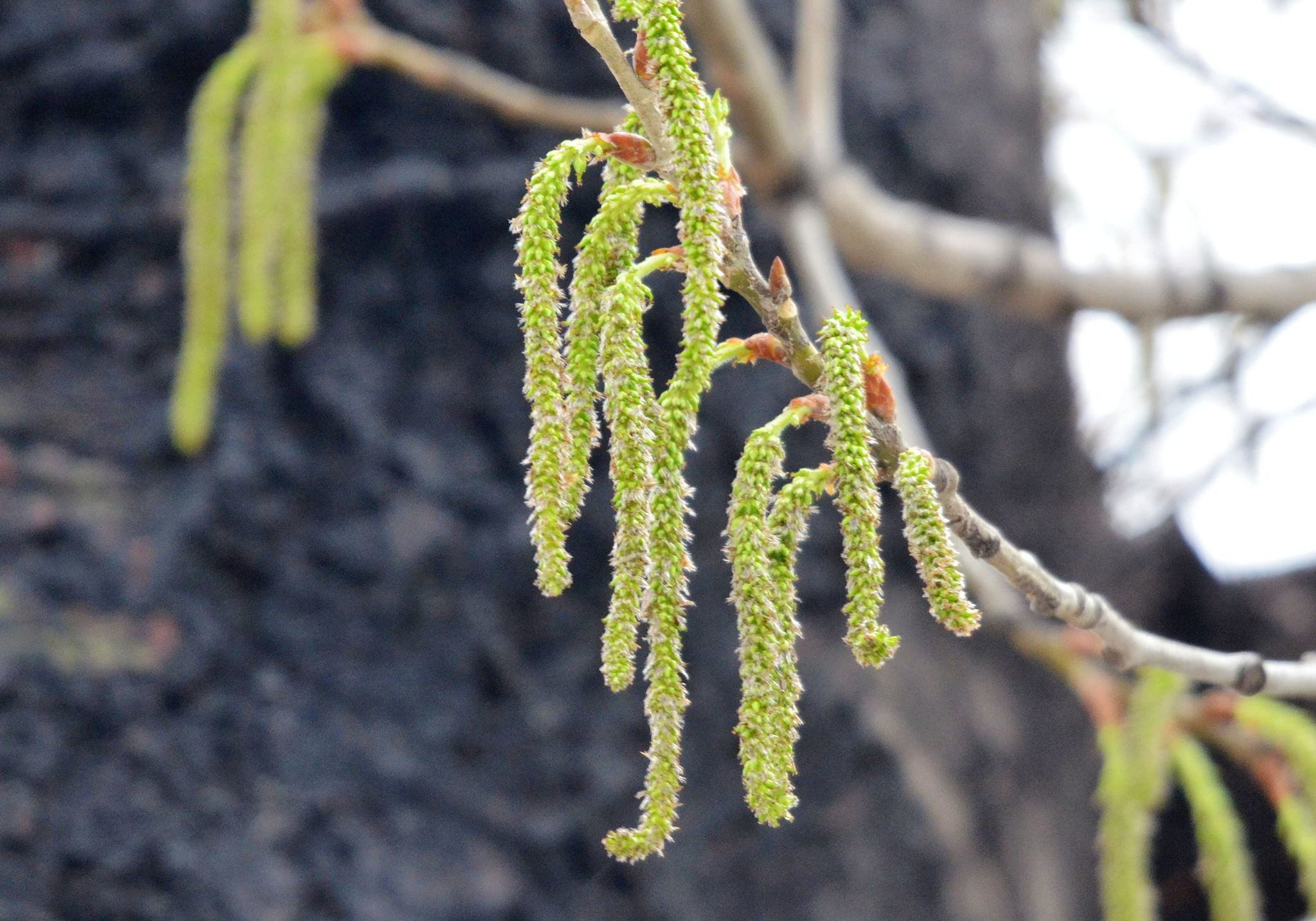

Scientific classification
- Kingdom: Plantae
- Clade: Embryophytes
- Clade: Tracheophytes
- Clade: Spermatophytes
- Clade: Angiosperms
- Clade: Eudicots
- Clade: Rosids
- Order: Malpighiales
- Family: Salicaceae
- Genus: Populus
- Species: P. × tomentosa

Binomial name
- Populus × tomentosa Carrière

Synonyms
- Populus × glabrata Dode; Populus × pekinensis L.Henry; Populus × tomentosa var. borealosinensis Yu Nung; Populus × tomentosa f. cordiconeifolia T.B.Chao & J.W.Liu; Populus × tomentosa f. deltatifolia T.B.Chao & Zhi X.Chen; Populus × tomentosa f. fastigiata Y.X.Wang; Populus × tomentosa var. ferruginea Z.Y.Yu & T.Z.Zhang; Populus × tomentosa var. honanica Yu Nung; Populus × tomentosa var. hopeinica Yu Nung; Populus × tomentosa f. lerigata T.B.Chao & Zhi X.Chen; Populus × tomentosa var. longibracteata Z.Y.Yu & T.Z.Zhang; Populus × tomentosa f. longipetiola T.B.Chao & J.W.Liu; Populus × tomentosa var. microphylla Yu Nung; Populus × tomentosa var. multilenticellia Yu Nung; Populus × tomentosa var. orbiculata Z.Y.Yu & T.Z.Zhang; Populus × tomentosa var. palmatibracteata Z.Y.Yu & T.Z.Zhang; Populus × tomentosa var. pyramidalis Shanling; Populus × tomentosa var. ramosissima Yu Nung; Populus × tomentosa var. stellaribracteata Z.Y.Yu & T.Z.Zhang; Populus × tomentosa var. truncata Y.C.Fu & Chung H.Wang; Populus × tomentosa f. yixianensis H.M.Jiang & J.X.Huang

= Populus × tomentosa =

Species of tree

Populus × tomentosa, commonly known as Chinese white poplar or Peking poplar, is a species of tree in the family Salicaceae. It is found across northern and eastern China, and has been introduced to the US state of Louisiana.

Populus × tomentosa is a large tree. The species has strong resistance to many diseases and insects. It also plays key roles in shelterbelts and urban afforestation in northern China.

Populus × tomentosa has long been suspected to be a hybrid, but its exact parents remain unknown.

Populus × tomentosa has relatively more fibrous roots than other trees.

== Distribution ==
Populus × tomentosa is found across northern and eastern China, and has been introduced to the US state of Louisiana. It is distributed between sea level and 1,500 metres (4,900 ft) in China.
