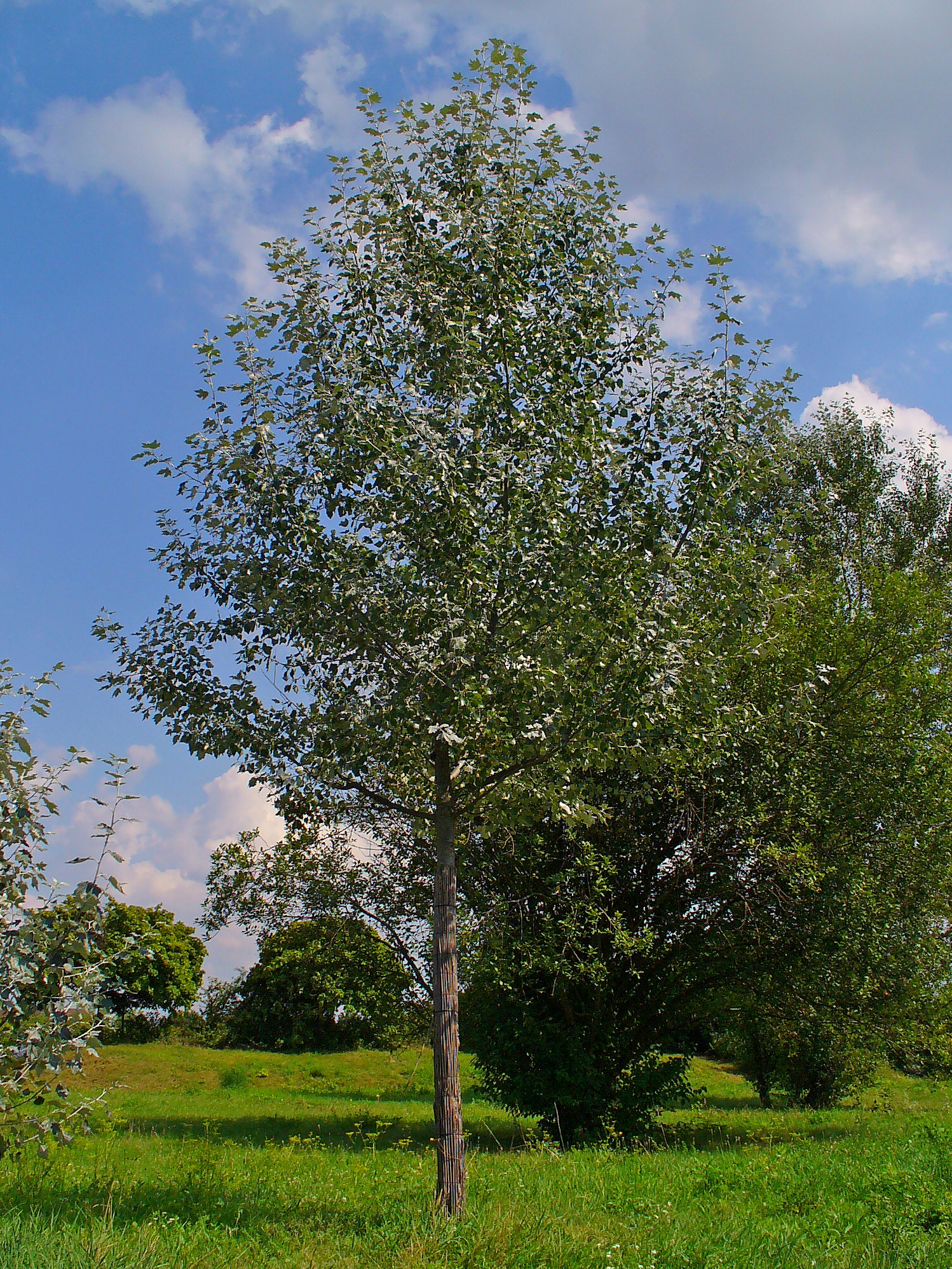

Conservation status
- Least Concern (IUCN 3.1)

- Secure (NatureServe)

Scientific classification
- Kingdom: Plantae
- Clade: Tracheophytes
- Clade: Angiosperms
- Clade: Eudicots
- Clade: Rosids
- Order: Malpighiales
- Family: Salicaceae
- Genus: Populus
- Section: Populus sect. Populus
- Species: P. alba

Binomial name
- Populus alba L.
- Native range

Synonyms
- List: Leuce alba (L.) Opiz; Populus aegyptiaca W.Baxter; Populus arbeel Curtis; Populus arembergiana Dippel; Populus arembergica Lodd. ex Loudon; Populus bachofenii Wierzb. ex Rchb.; Populus belgica Lodd. ex Loudon; Populus berkarensis Poljakov; Populus bolleana Lauche; Populus caspica (Bornm.) Bornm.; Populus denudata A.Braun; Populus excelsa Salisb.; Populus grisea Lodd. ex Loudon; Populus hickeliana Dode; Populus hybrida M.Bieb.; Populus hyrcana Grossh.; Populus intermedia Mert. ex Loudon; Populus major Mill.; Populus morisetiana Dode; Populus nivea (Aiton) Willd.; Populus paletskyana Dode; Populus palmata Loudon; Populus pseudonivea Grossh.; Populus quercifolia Loudon; Populus subintegerrima (Lange) Sennen & Mauricio; Populus triloba Dode; Populus viminalis Poir.

= Populus alba =

White poplar

Species of tree

Populus alba, commonly called silver poplar, silverleaf poplar, white poplar, or abele, is a species of poplar, most closely related to the aspens (Populus sect. Populus). It is native to a region spanning from the Atlas Mountains of Africa, through most of South and Central Europe, into Central Asia; it has been introduced to many temperate, moist regions worldwide. It grows in moist sites, often by watersides, in regions with hot summers and cold to mild winters.

== Description ==
It is a medium-sized deciduous tree, growing to heights of up to 15–30 m (49–98 ft) (rarely more), with a trunk up to 2 m (6.6 ft) in diameter and a broad, rounded crown. The bark is smooth and greenish-white to greyish-white with characteristic diamond-shaped dark marks on young trees, becoming blackish and fissured at the base of old trees. The young shoots are covered with whitish-grey down, including the small buds. The leaves are 4–15 cm (1 1/2–6 in) long, five-lobed, with a thick covering of white scurfy down on both sides, but thicker underneath; this layer wears off 8 cm (3 1/4 in) long, produced in early spring; they are dioecious, with male and female catkins on separate trees; the male catkins are grey with conspicuous dark red stamens, the female catkins are greyish-green. The female catkins lengthen to 8–10 cm (3 1/4–4 in) after pollination, with several green seed capsules, maturing in late spring to early summer. It also propagates by means of root suckers growing from the lateral roots, often as far as 20–30 m (65–100 ft) from the trunk, to form extensive clonal colonies.

Distinguishing features of the white poplar

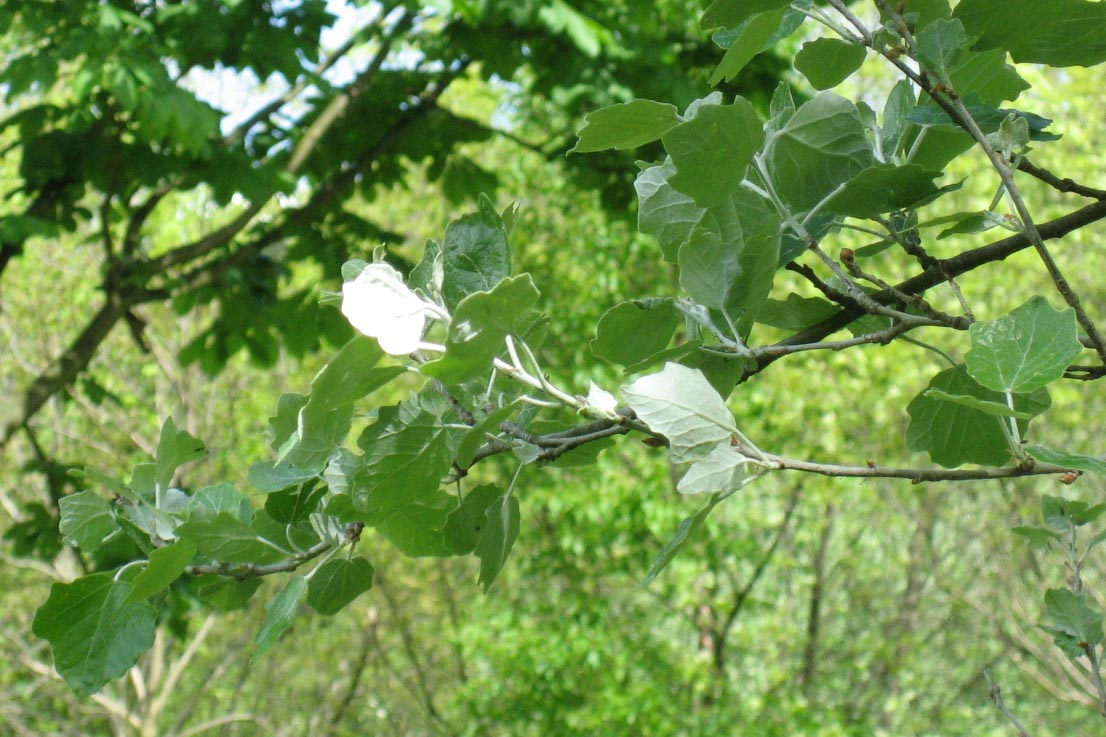
Foliage of the white poplar

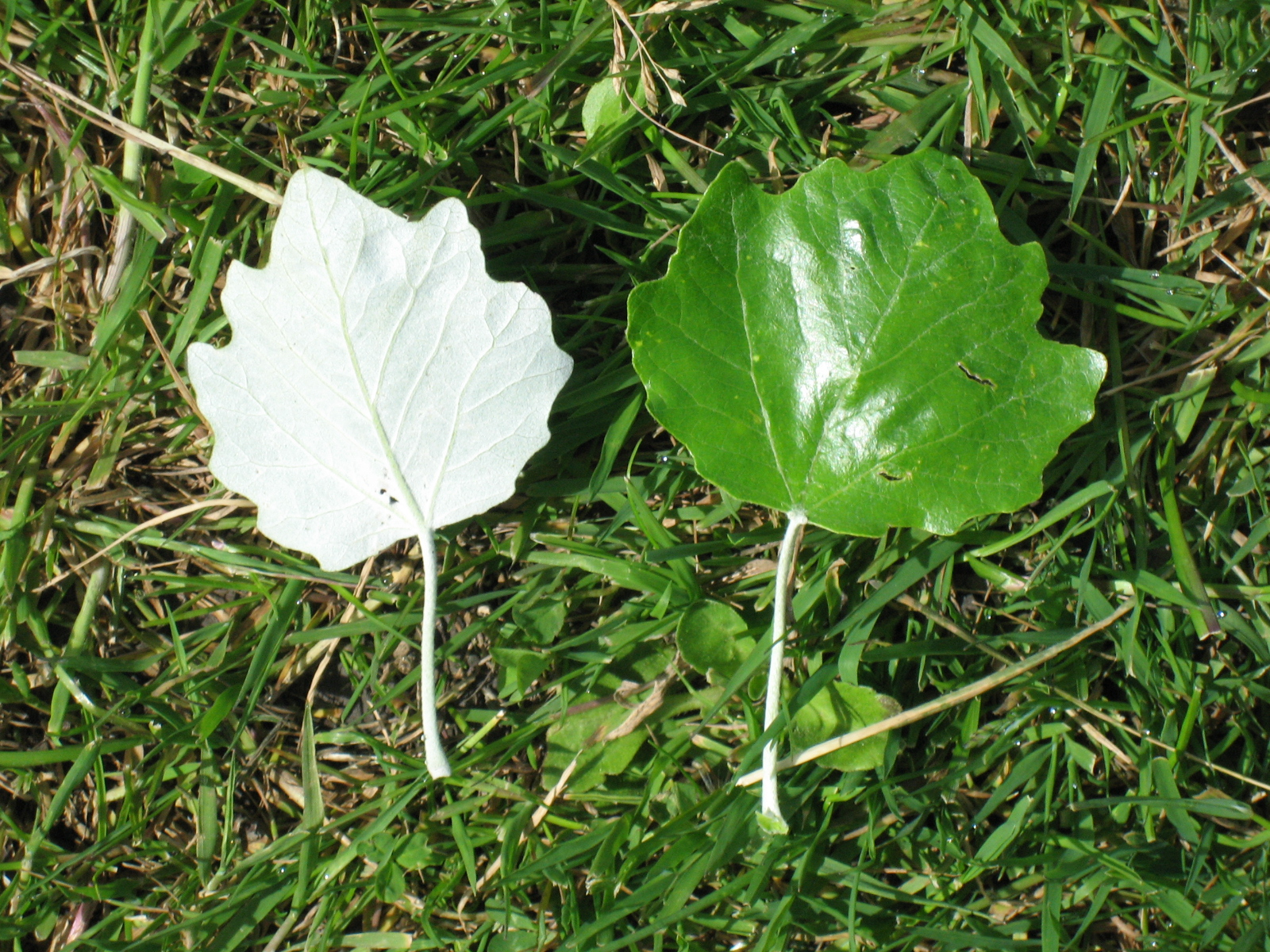
White poplar leaves; underside left, upper side right

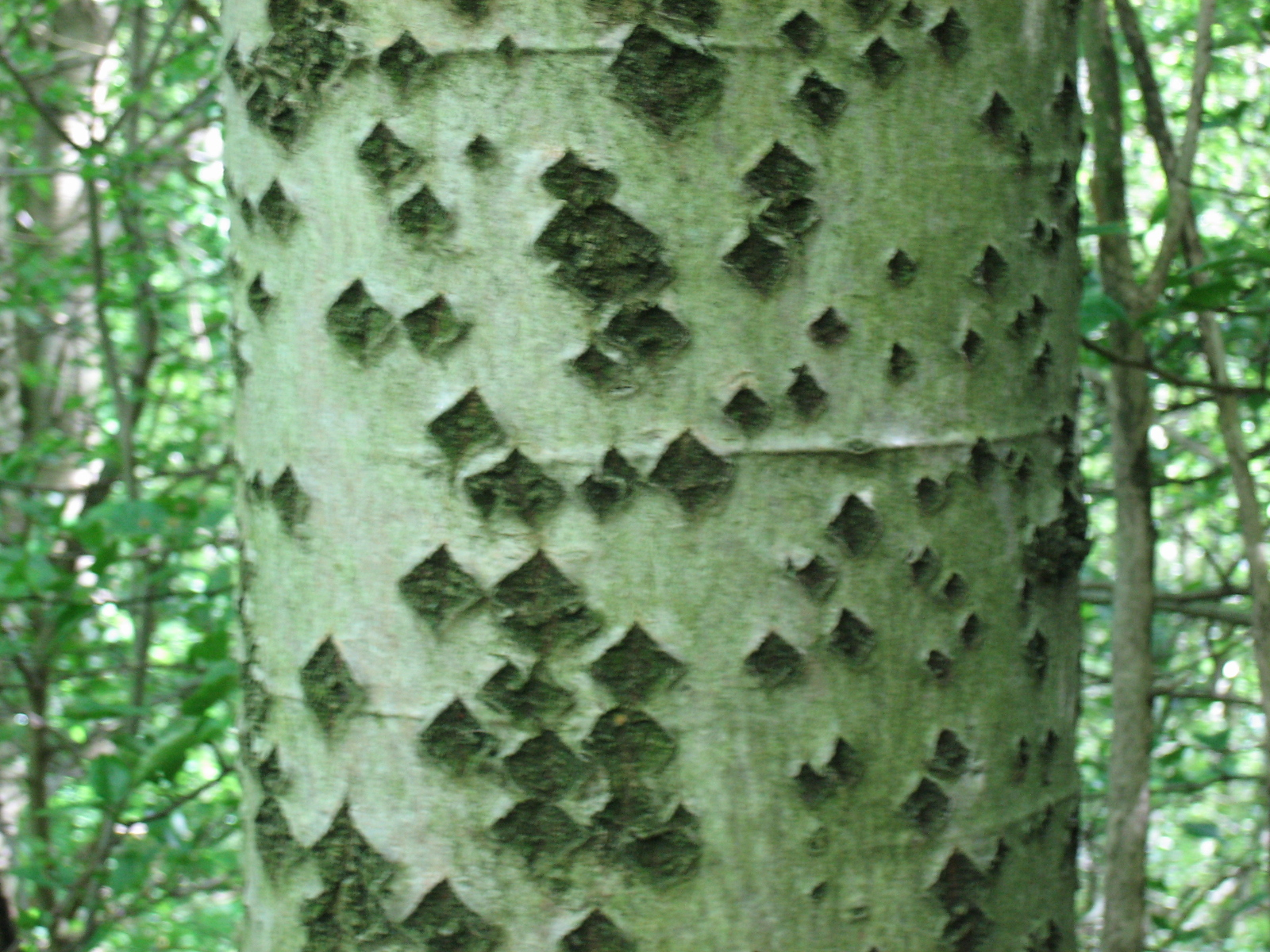
Trunk, showing the characteristic diamond-shaped marks

== Hybridization ==
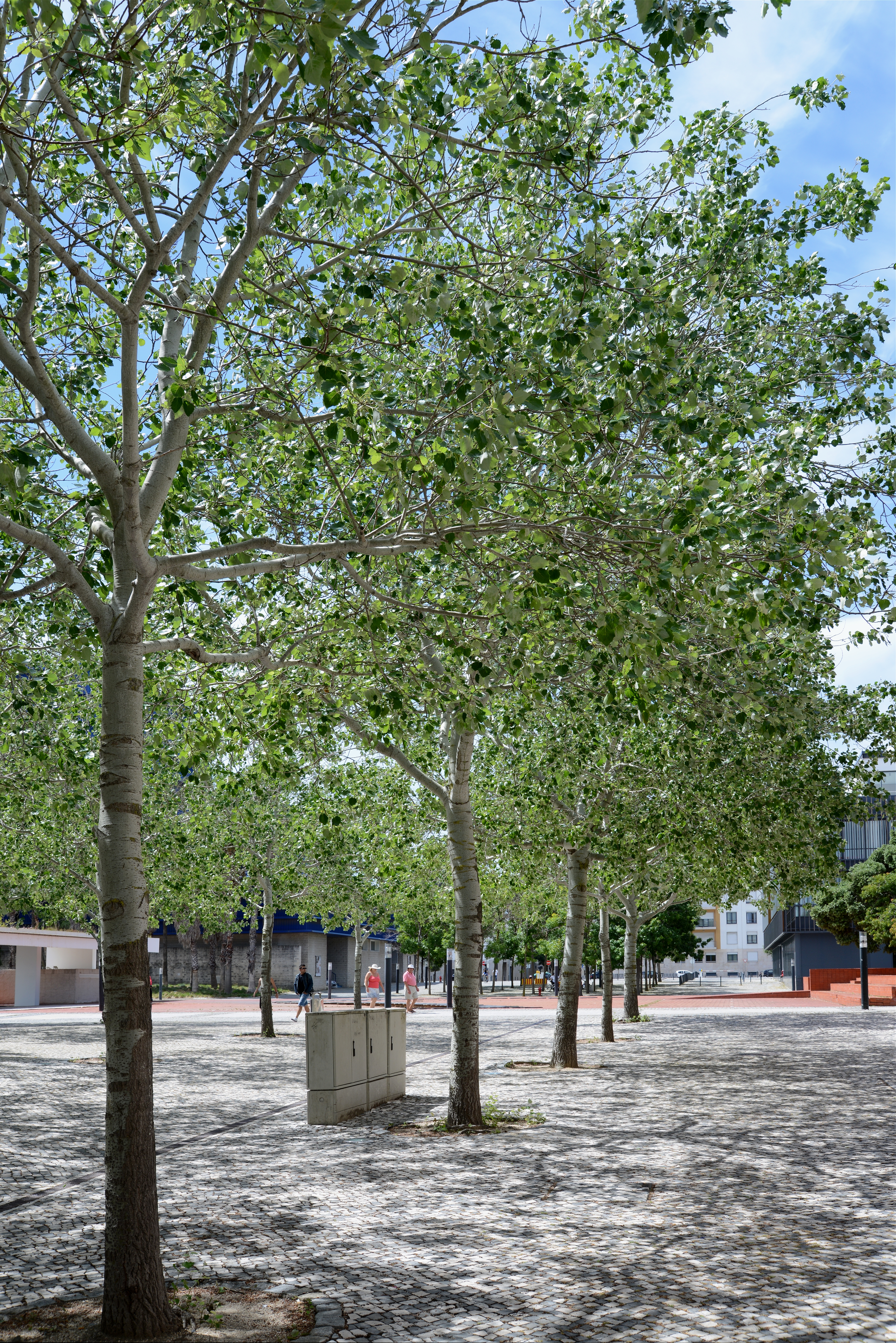
Alley of grey poplars

White poplar hybridizes with the closely related common aspen Populus tremula; the resulting hybrid, known as grey poplar (Populus × canescens), is intermediate between its parents, with a thin, grey, downy coating on the leaves, which are also much less deeply lobed than white poplar leaves. It exhibits marked hybrid vigour, reaching 40 m (130 ft) tall and a trunk diameter over 1.5 m (4 ft 11 in), much larger than either of its parents. Most grey poplars in cultivation are male, but female trees occur naturally and some of these are also propagated.

== Cultivation and uses ==
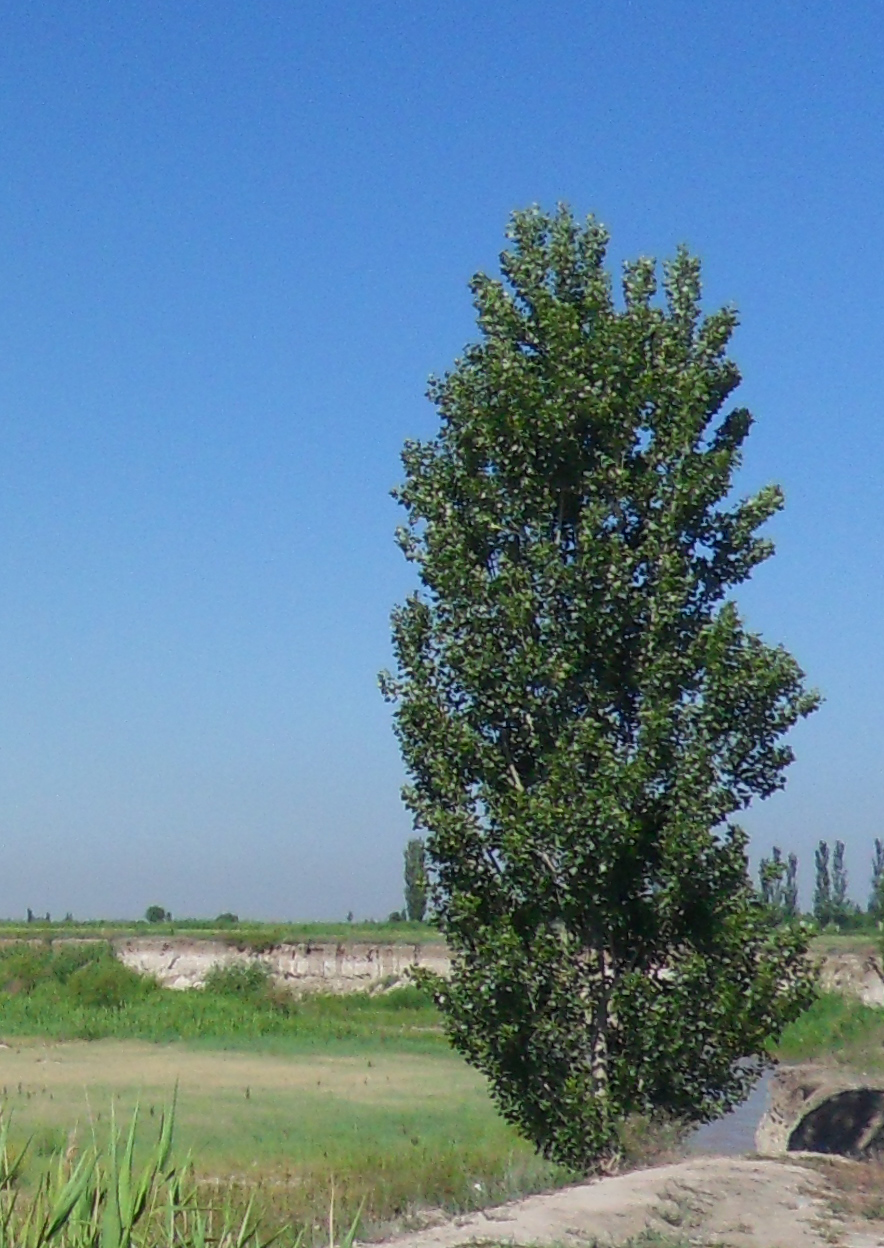
Populus alba Pyramidalis

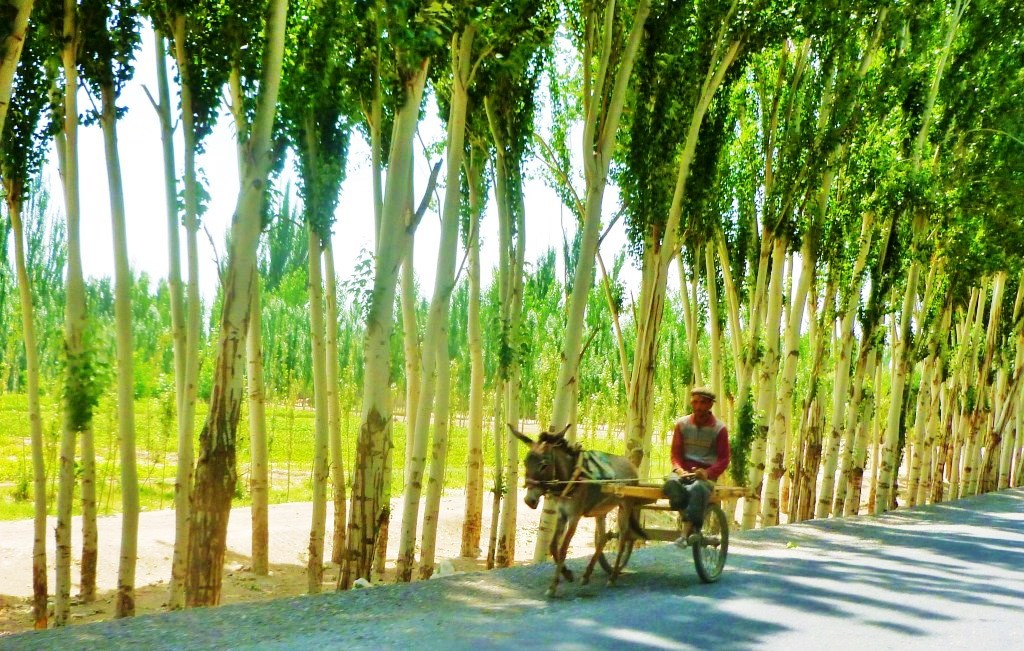
Poplar-lined road between Yarkand and Kargilik

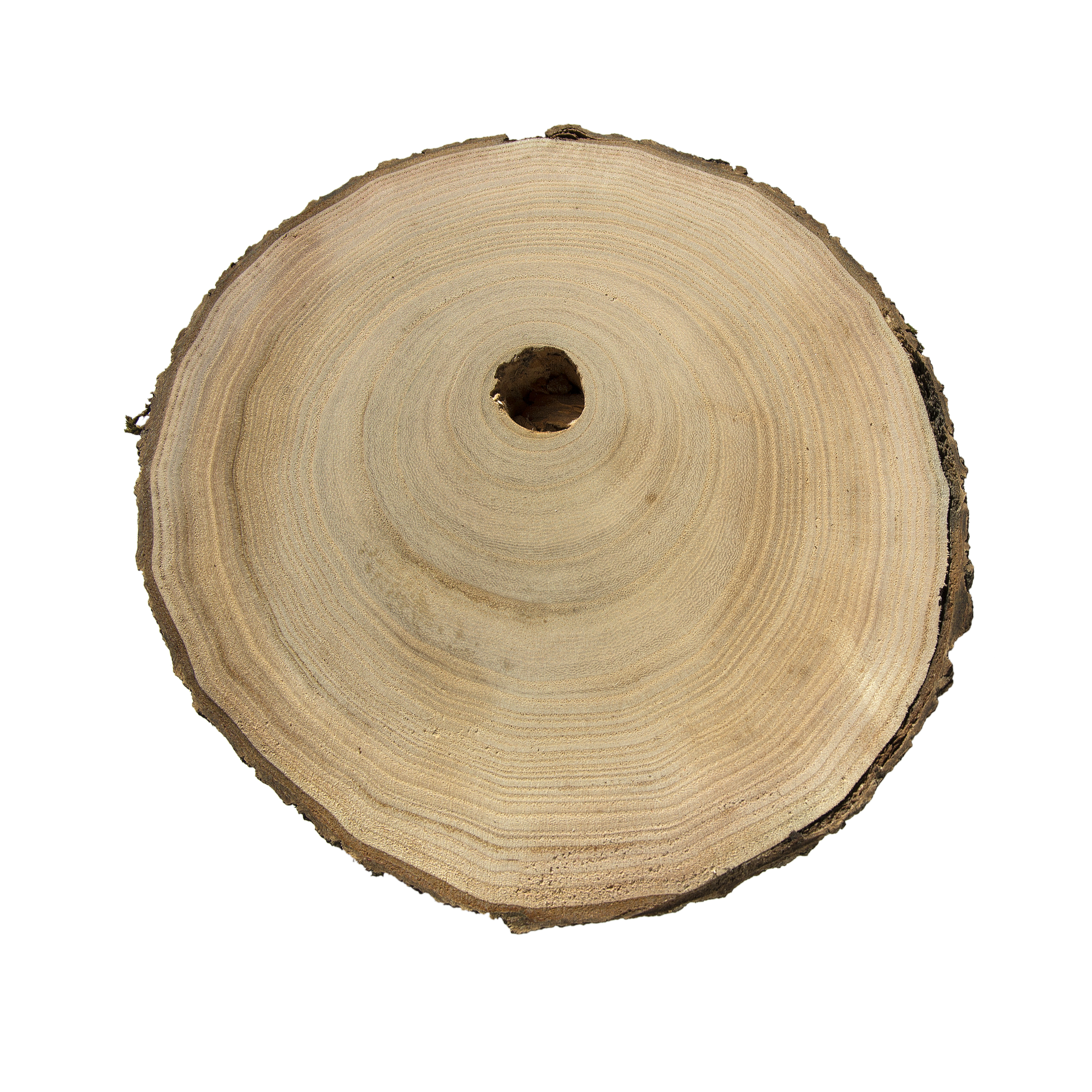
Populus alba - wood

The wood is soft but close-grained and easy to carve, shrinking very little during seasoning. It has been used for sculpture from Europe to China and the US. The Penitent Magdalene by Donatello is one 15th-century example.

It was the most commonly used wood for panel paintings in Italy throughout the Middle Ages and Renaissance, until mostly replaced as a matrix by canvas from 1500 onwards. Most earlier Italian Renaissance paintings are painted on poplar panels, the Mona Lisa being but one example.

White poplar requires abundant light and ample moisture, and stands up well to flood water and slightly acidic soils. Its green-and-white leaves make it an effective ornamental tree, but the root suckers may cause problems in some situations. It is very attractive as an open-grown tree in water meadows, and because of its extensive root system and tolerance of salt, is also planted to strengthen coastal sand dunes.

A yellow dye is produced from the bark of the white poplar.

The majority of white poplars in cultivation in northern Europe are female trees.

=== Americas ===
White poplar was first introduced to North America in 1748 and has a long history in cultivation. It is now found in 43 states throughout the contiguous US. It has come to be considered weedy or invasive; it has been banned in Connecticut and is the most common introduced tree species on Cape Breton Island.

In US intensive forest management, it is being replaced by various Populus sect. Aigeiros hybrids. The wood is soft, and used for cellulose and to make cheap boxes.

It also grows in the temperate zones of South America, mainly in Chile, Argentina and Uruguay. A conical cultivar from Turkestan, Populus alba 'Pyramidalis' (Bolle's poplar; syn. P. bolleana) is sometimes planted in parks.

== History ==
An Old English name abele, now not used, is derived from the Latin albellus, white, by way of Old French aubel and Low German name abeel.

Leuce/Leuka, the "White Poplar"; Leuce or Leuka (Ancient Greek: Λεύκη) ("White" or specifically "White Poplar") was the most beautiful of the nymphs and an Oceanid, a daughter of Oceanus. Hades fell in love with her and abducted her to the underworld. She lived out the span of her life in his realm, and when she died, the god sought consolation by creating a suitable memorial of their love: In the Elysian Fields, where the pious spend their afterlives, he brought forth a white tree into existence from her body, which became sacred for him from that moment on. In Ancient Greco-Roman mythology, it is a symbol of a peaceful afterlife and a memory of those we love who have died. Herakles crowned himself with this tree to celebrate his return from the underworld.

According to ancient Roman mythology, the white poplar was consecrated to Hercules because he destroyed Cacus in a cavern adjoining the Aventine Hill, which was covered with these trees; in the moment of his triumph, he bound his brows with a branch of white poplar as a token of his victory. Persons offering sacrifices to Hercules were always crowned with branches of this tree, and all who had gloriously conquered their enemies in battle wore garlands of it, in imitation of Hercules. Homer in Iliad compares the fall of Simoisius when killed by Ajax to that of a poplar.

So falls a poplar that on watery ground
Raised high its head with stately branches crowned.

Ovid mentions that Paris had carved the name of Ænone on a poplar, as Shakespeare has Orlando carve the name of Rosalind upon the trees of the forest of Arden.

Virgil gives directions for the culture of this tree and Horace speaks of the white poplar as delighting to grow on the banks of rivers.

== Invasive potential ==
The white poplar is an invasive species in many parts of Australia. In Western Australia, it has formed dense stands in disturbed wetlands from Perth to Albany and it is considered a threat to riparian vegetation in Victoria. It has spread along the Murrumbidgee River and in wet areas in rural parts of the Australian Capital Territory. Its seeds can also cause bronchial problems in humans, and its powerful roots have cracked walls, and caused damage to pipes. Despite that, it is still sold in nurseries around Australia. White poplar is also an environmental weed in South Africa. However, it also has its benefits: its wood is used for producing matchsticks, firewood, and roof construction.
