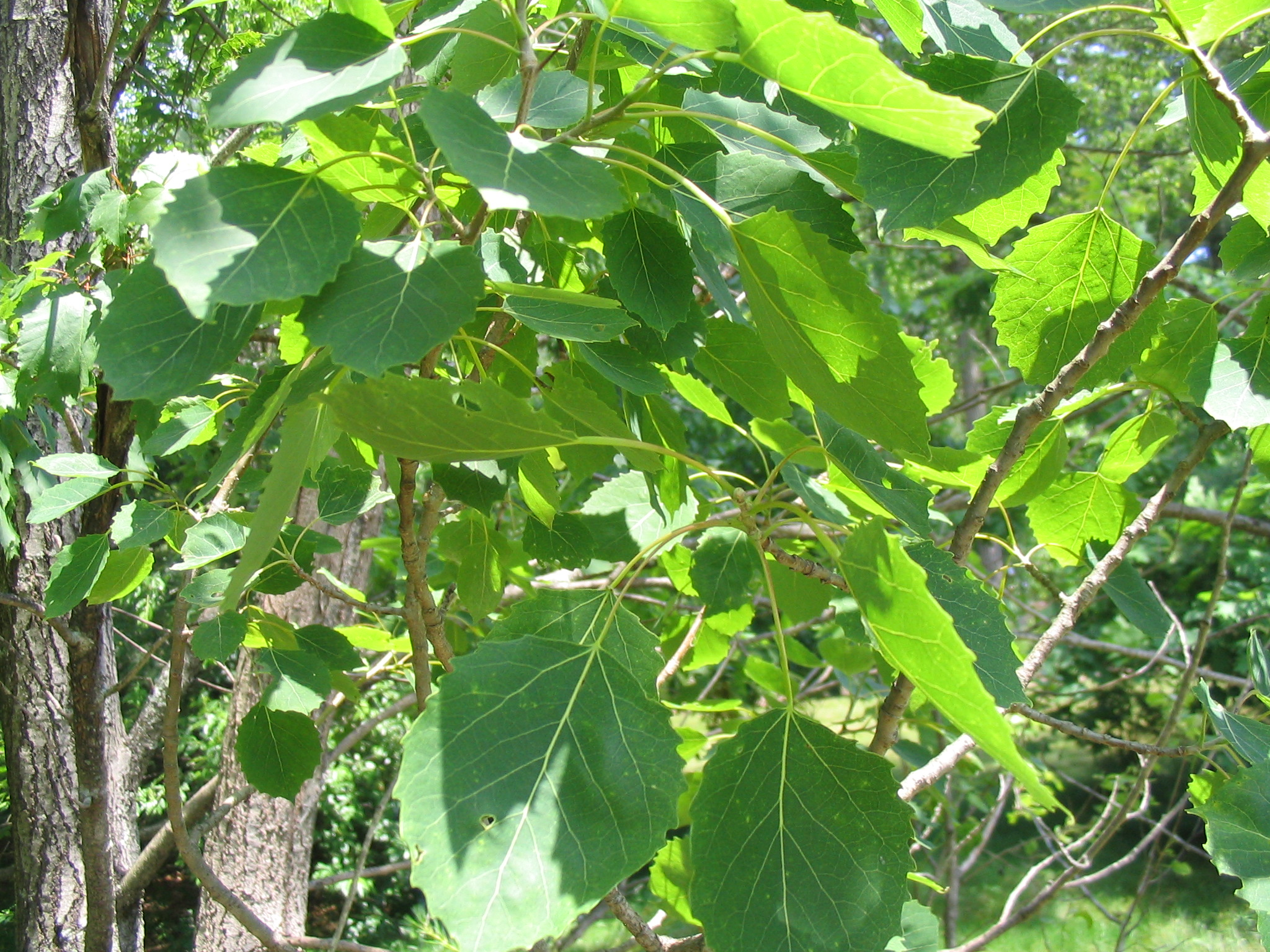

Conservation status
- Least Concern (IUCN 3.1)

Scientific classification
- Kingdom: Plantae
- Clade: Tracheophytes
- Clade: Angiosperms
- Clade: Eudicots
- Clade: Rosids
- Order: Malpighiales
- Family: Salicaceae
- Genus: Populus
- Section: Populus sect. Populus
- Species: P. grandidentata

Binomial name
- Populus grandidentata Michaux
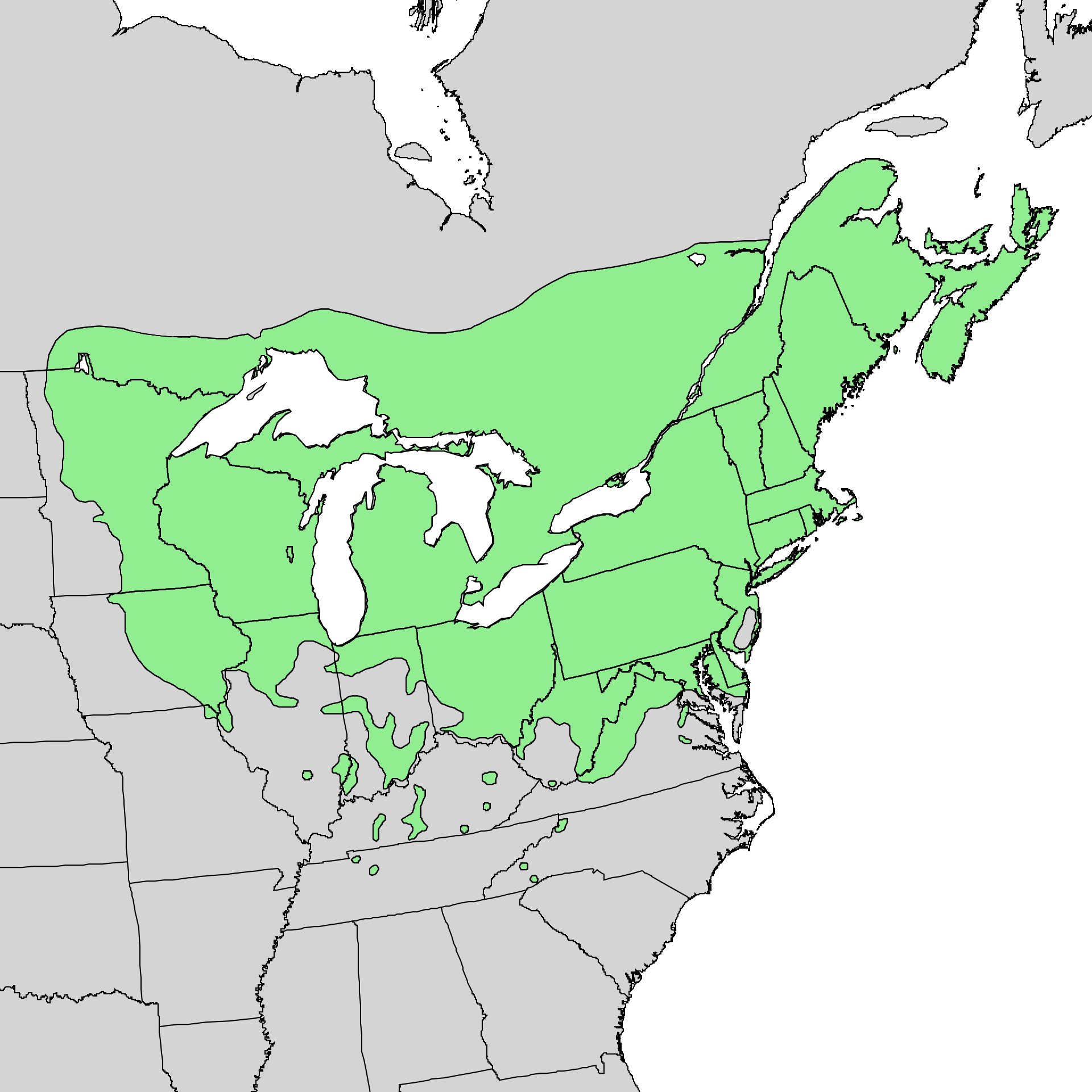
- Natural range

= Populus grandidentata =

Species of deciduous tree native to North America

Populus grandidentata, commonly called large-tooth aspen, big-tooth aspen, American aspen, Canadian poplar, or white poplar, is a deciduous tree native to eastern North America.

== Name ==
The name Populus is from the Latin for poplar, and grandidentata refers to the coarse teeth on the leaves (grandis meaning "large", and dentata meaning "toothed").

== Description ==
Populus grandidentata is a medium-sized deciduous tree native to North America, found mostly in the northeastern United States and southeastern Canada. Leaves are similar to Populus tremuloides, but slightly larger and having larger teeth. The leaves tremble in the wind as those of P. tremuloides do. Bark of younger trees is olive-green, thin and smooth; after 30–40 years, the bark is gray, thick and rough with grooves.

== Reproduction ==
Bigtooth aspens produce seeds from wind-pollinated flower clusters, known as catkins. The tree is dioecious, meaning that male and female flowers are on separate trees, which flower from mid-April to mid-May depending on the climate zone. The seed, a two-valved capsule, is distributed widely by the wind. Seed production begins around 10 years old. Individuals can also reproduce through the roots after a disturbance event, such as fire or harvest; the roots of the dead/cut tree will begin to send up suckers, creating identical individuals, and can result in a stand of clones that resemble that individual. Seeds viability is high (around 80%) but despite this and the sheer number of seeds produced (a mature tree can produce over 1 million per season), very few actually end up germinating due to their short viability (two weeks), natural growth inhibitor, and high likelihood of landing in spots unsuitable for germination, which must be done on the surface of moist soil.

== Growth ==
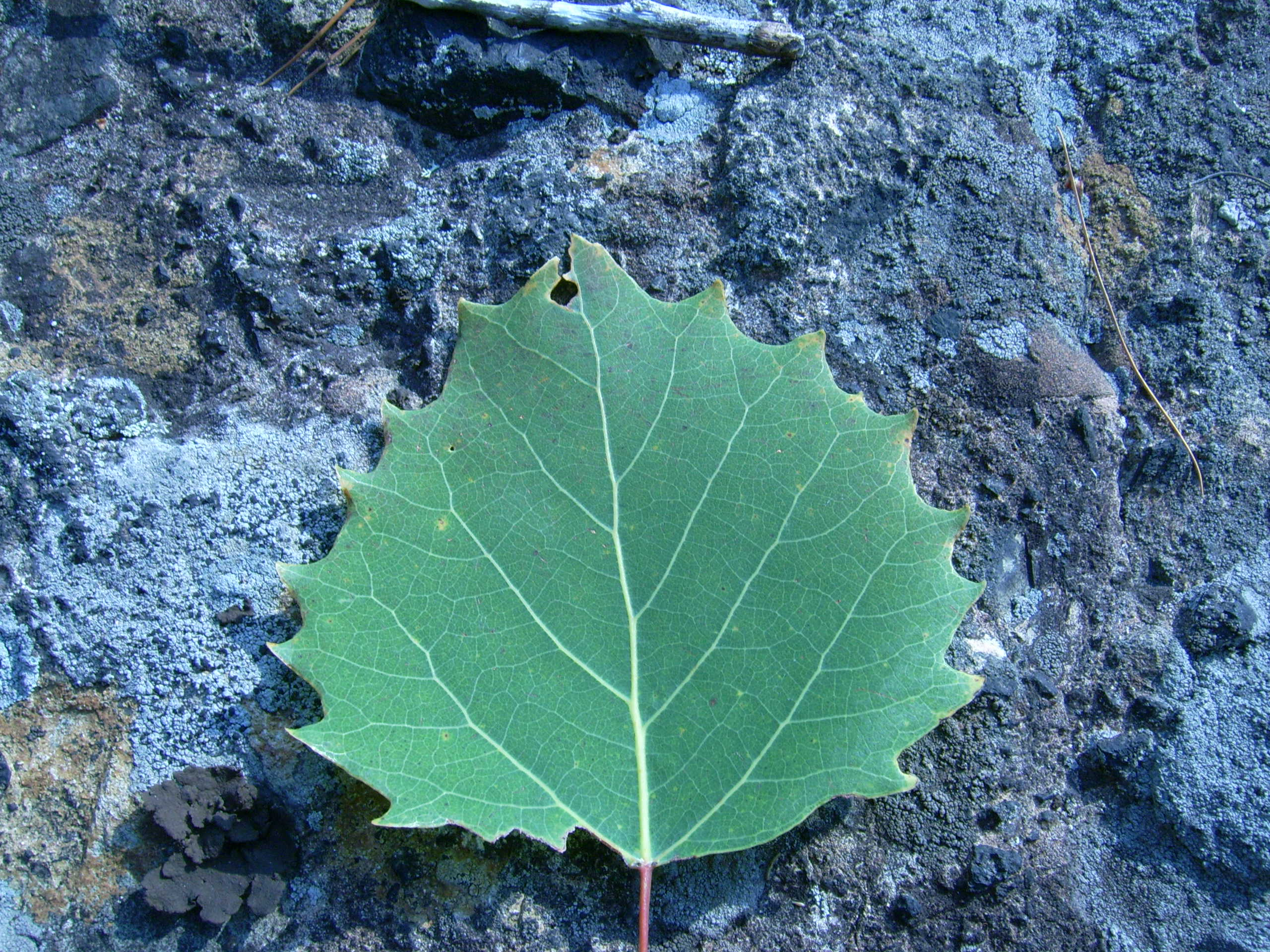
Leaf of Populus grandidentata or "big-tooth aspen"

Bigtooth aspens are dioecious, medium-sized deciduous trees with straight trunks and gently ascending branches. Heights at maturity are around 60–80 feet (18–24 m) with diameters of 8–10 inches (20–25 cm). They are fast growing and are relatively short-lived; stands will begin to deteriorate after 60–70 years, while individuals can live up to 100 years. They often constitute early successional species of their landscapes. Roots are shallow and wide spreading; lateral root growth in a forest may be as far as 60 feet (18 m). Generally, four to five lateral roots originate from the tree, and then branch within 2 feet (60 cm); vertical, penetrating roots near the base anchor the tree.

== Distribution ==
The range of Populus grandidentata extends from Virginia north to Maine and Cape Breton Island, Nova Scotia; west to southeastern Manitoba and Minnesota; south through Iowa to extreme northeastern Missouri; and east through Illinois, Indiana, Ohio, and West Virginia. Disjunct populations are found in Kentucky, Tennessee, North Carolina, and South Carolina.

== Ecology ==
The species is able to adapt to a wide range of soils, though it is most abundant on sands, loamy sands and light sandy loams. Big-tooth aspens can tolerate sandy uplands and high, rocky sites. The depth to the water table is generally about 5 feet (1.5 m). Soil must be moist but well-aerated for good growth. Being very shade intolerant, most shaded stems die. They are pioneer species on disturbed sites, persisting in successional communities until senescence. Rapid height growth of suckers allows it to outcompete other sprouting species such as red oak (Quercus rubra) and red maple (Acer rubrum) on many sites. In the absence of disturbance, it is soon replaced by conifers and hardwoods. In the Great Lakes Region at the turn of the 20th century, many mature pine forests were logged and burned. Bigtooth and quaking aspens frequently dominated the postdisturbance forests. Without fire or other disturbance, these forests are being replaced by later successional, shade-tolerant species. This aspen usually grows in even-aged, mixed stands, most commonly with quaking aspens. Codominant in both hardwood and coniferous forests, it does not occur as a subdominant because of its extreme shade intolerance. Quaking aspen (Populus tremuloides) is the predominant species in aspen stands in the Great Lakes region, but bigtooth aspen dominates on drier, upland sites. Aspen stands dominated by bigtooth aspens are generally more open than those dominated by quaking aspens. It is more disease resistant than P. tremuloides. The most serious disease is hypoxylon canker (caused by Entoleuca mammata). Other rots, fungi, and root decay affect this species. A preferred host of the spongy moth, tree death occurs when near-complete defoliation by the spongy moth is followed by an infestation of Armillaria fungus. The ambrosia beetle (Xyleborus saxesceni) attacks fire-damaged bigtooth aspens. Commonly, it occurs in areas that frequently burn, such as large upland areas distant from water and upwind of natural fire breaks, such as lakes.

== Uses ==
Various wildlife feed on the bark, foliage, and twig buds.

The wood weighs 27 pounds (12 kg) per foot and is light-colored, straight-grained, fine-textured, and soft. It is used primarily for pulp, but can be used to make particle board and structural panels. Minor uses include log homes, pallets, boxes, match splints, chopsticks, hockey stick components, and ladders. The bark is pelletized for fuel and supplemental cattle feed.

It is occasionally cultivated. A cultivar, Grandmont, has recently been developed. It has an open growth habit with balanced branching.
