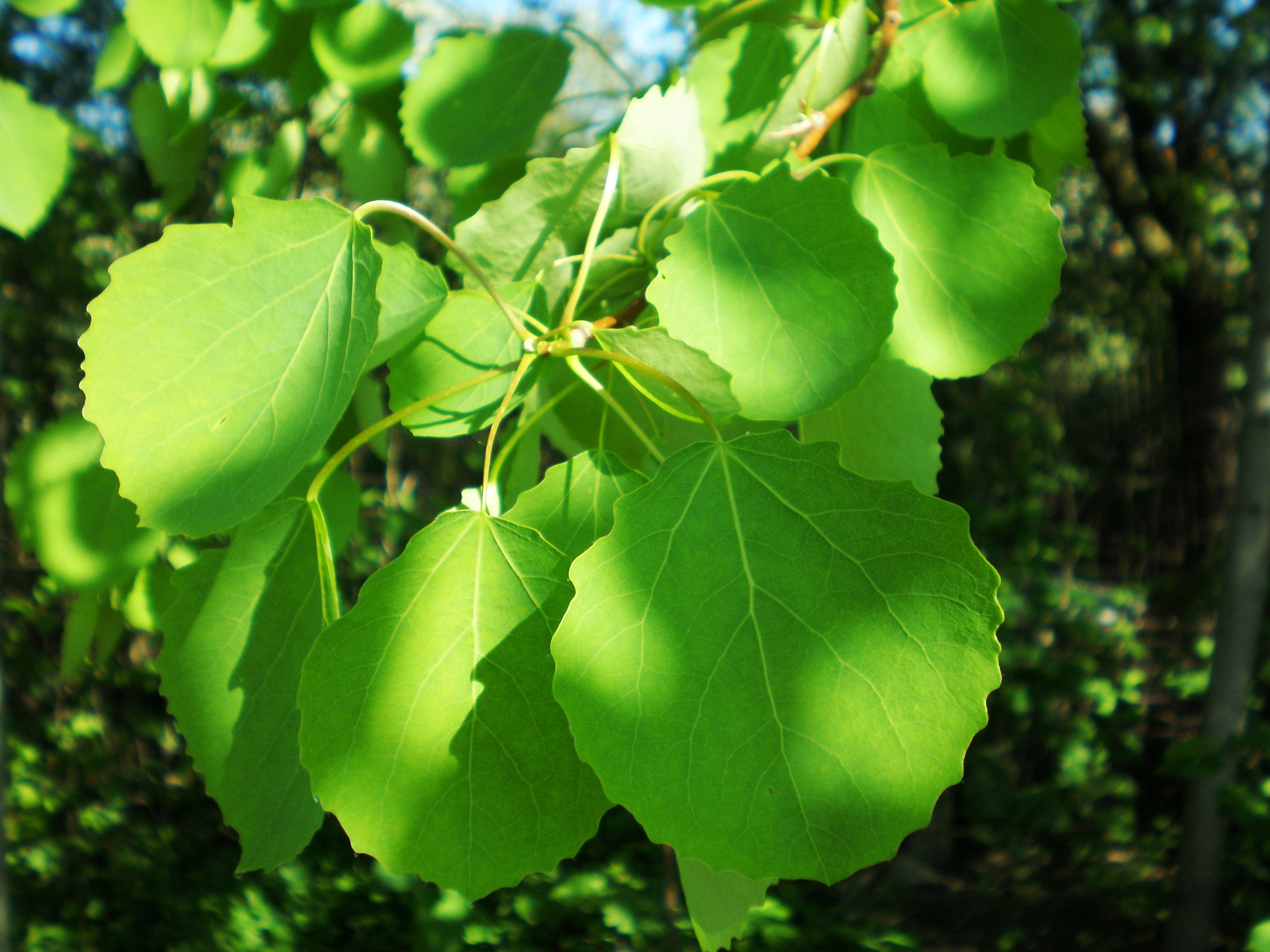

Conservation status
- Least Concern (IUCN 3.1)

Scientific classification
- Kingdom: Plantae
- Clade: Tracheophytes
- Clade: Angiosperms
- Clade: Eudicots
- Clade: Rosids
- Order: Malpighiales
- Family: Salicaceae
- Genus: Populus
- Section: Populus sect. Populus
- Species: P. tremula

Binomial name
- Populus tremula L.
- Distribution map

= Populus tremula =

Species of plant

Populus tremula (commonly called aspen, common aspen, Eurasian aspen, European aspen, or quaking aspen) is a species of poplar native to cool temperate regions of the Old World.

== Description ==
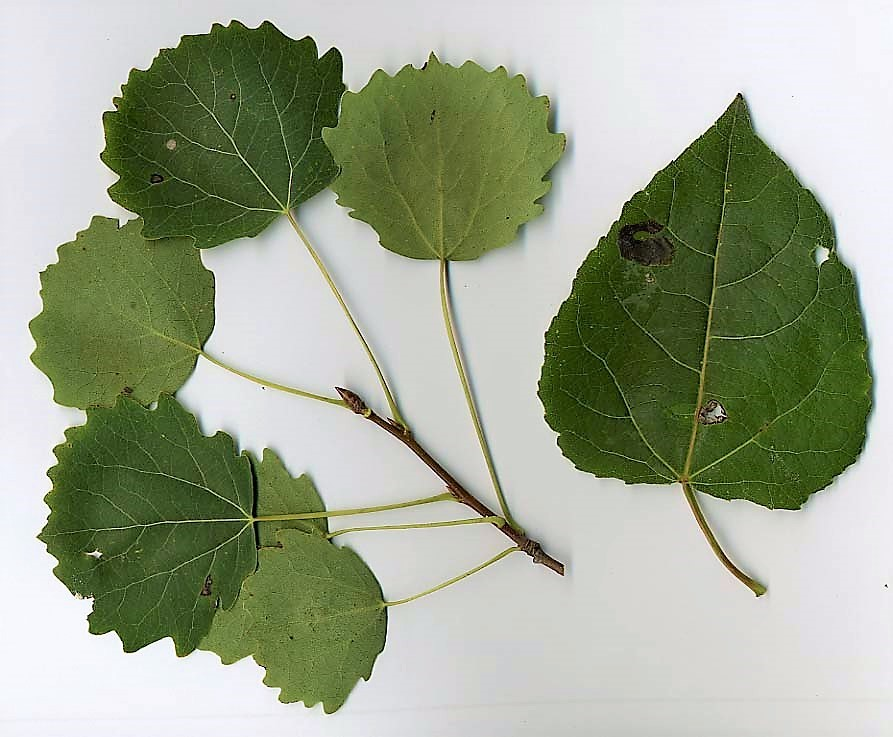
Adult leaves (left); juvenile and sucker leaves (right)

It is a substantial deciduous tree growing to 40 metres (130 ft) tall by 10 m (33 ft) broad, with a trunk attaining over 1 metre (3 ft 3 in) in diameter. The bark is pale greenish-grey and smooth on young trees with dark grey diamond-shaped lenticels, becoming dark grey and fissured on older trees.

In Nigula Nature Reserve in Estonia, a 45.5 meter tall aspen is found that might be the tallest specimen in Europe.

The adult leaves, produced on branches of mature trees, are nearly round, slightly wider than long, 2–8 cm (1–3 in) diameter, with a coarsely toothed margin and a laterally flattened petiole 4–8 cm (2–3 in) long. The flat petiole allows them to tremble in even slight breezes, and is the source of its scientific name, as well as one of its vernacular names "langues de femmes" attributed to Gerard's 17th-century Herball. The leaves on seedlings and fast-growing stems of suckers (root sprouts) are of a different shape, heart-shaped to nearly triangular. They are also often much larger, up to 20 centimetres (7.9 in) long; their petiole is also less flattened.

The flowers are wind-pollinated catkins produced in early spring before the new leaves appear; they are dioecious, with male and female catkins on different trees. The male catkins are patterned green and brown, 5–10 centimetres (2.0–3.9 in) long when shedding pollen; the female catkins are green, 2–6 centimetres (0.79–2.36 in) long at pollination, maturing in early summer to bear 10–20 (50–80) capsules each containing numerous tiny seeds embedded in downy fluff. The fluff assists wind dispersal of the seeds when the capsules split open at maturity.

It can be distinguished from the closely related North American Populus tremuloides, which is nearly identical, by the leaves being more coarsely toothed.

Like other aspens, it spreads extensively by suckers (root sprouts), which may be produced up to 40 m from the parent tree, forming extensive clonal colonies. This often makes the job of clearing unwanted trees from an area especially difficult, as new suckers will continue to sprout from the extensive root system for up to several years after all surface growth has been eliminated.

== Distribution and habitat ==
The species is native to Europe and Asia, from Iceland and the British Isles east to Kamchatka, north to inside the Arctic Circle in Scandinavia and northern Russia, and south to central Spain, Turkey, the Tian Shan, North Korea, and northern Japan. It also occurs at one site in northwest Africa in Algeria. In the south of its range, it occurs at high altitudes in mountains.

== Ecology ==
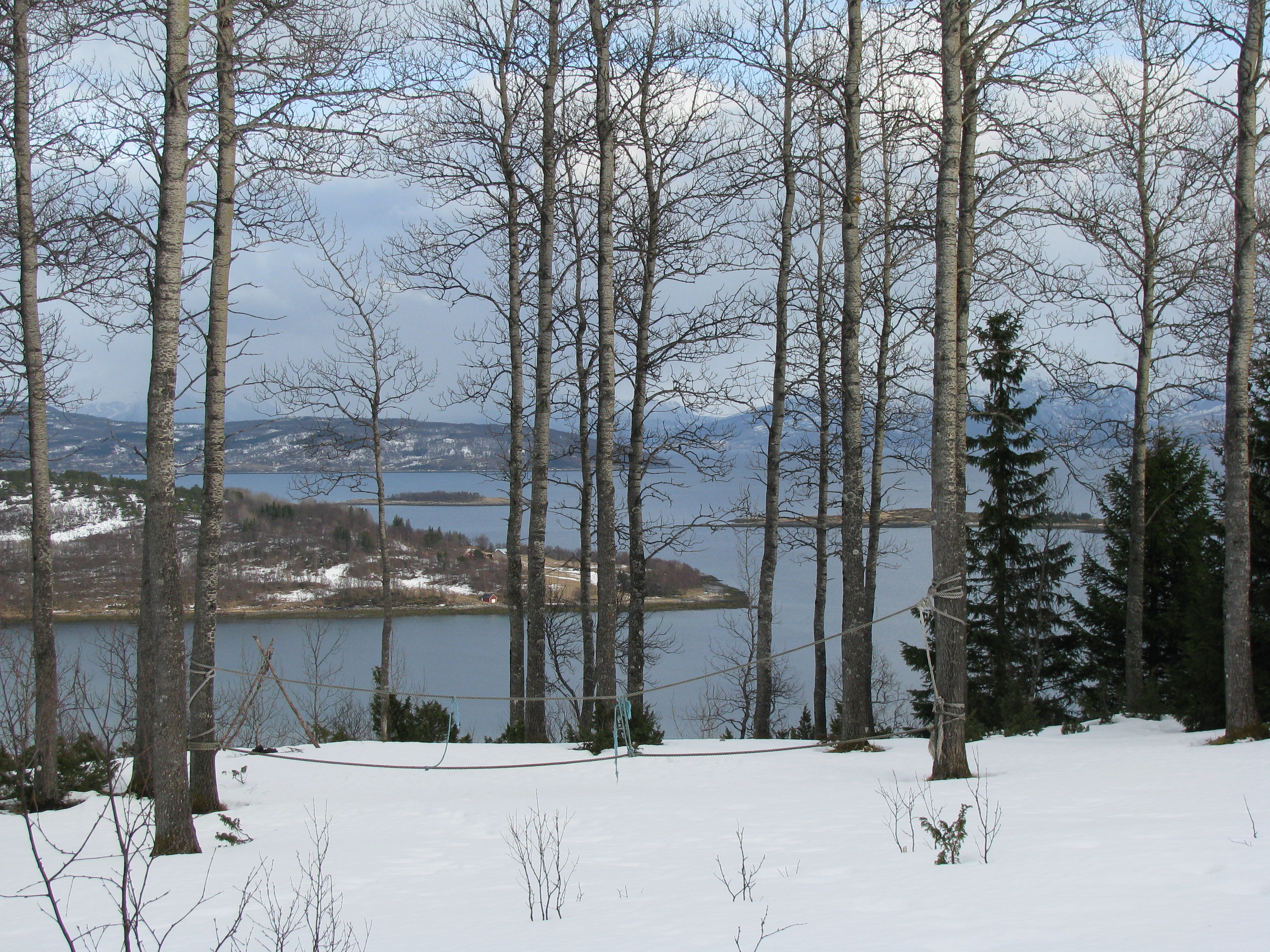
Populus tremula growing well north of the Arctic Circle in Norway; April 2008.

Eurasian aspen is a water and light demanding species that is able to vigorously colonize an open area after fire, clear cutting or other kinds of damage. After an individual has been damaged or destroyed, root suckers are produced abundantly on the shallow lateral roots. Fast growth continues until the age of about 20 years, when crown competition increases. After that, growth speed decreases and culminates at about 30 years of age. Aspen can reach an age of 200 years.

It is a very hardy species and tolerates long, cold winters and short summers.

Aspen is resistant to browsing pressure by fallow deer owing to its unpleasant taste.

This species is important for the hornet moth, which uses it as a host during the larval stage.

== Fossil record ==
Fossils of Populus tremula have been described from the fossil flora of Kızılcahamam district in Turkey which is of early Pliocene age.

== Cultivation ==
The aspen is found in cultivation in parks and large gardens. The fastigiate cultivar 'Erecta', with bright yellow autumn colouring, has gained the Royal Horticultural Society's Award of Garden Merit. The cultivar is colloquially known as "Swedish columnar" in Canada and the United States.

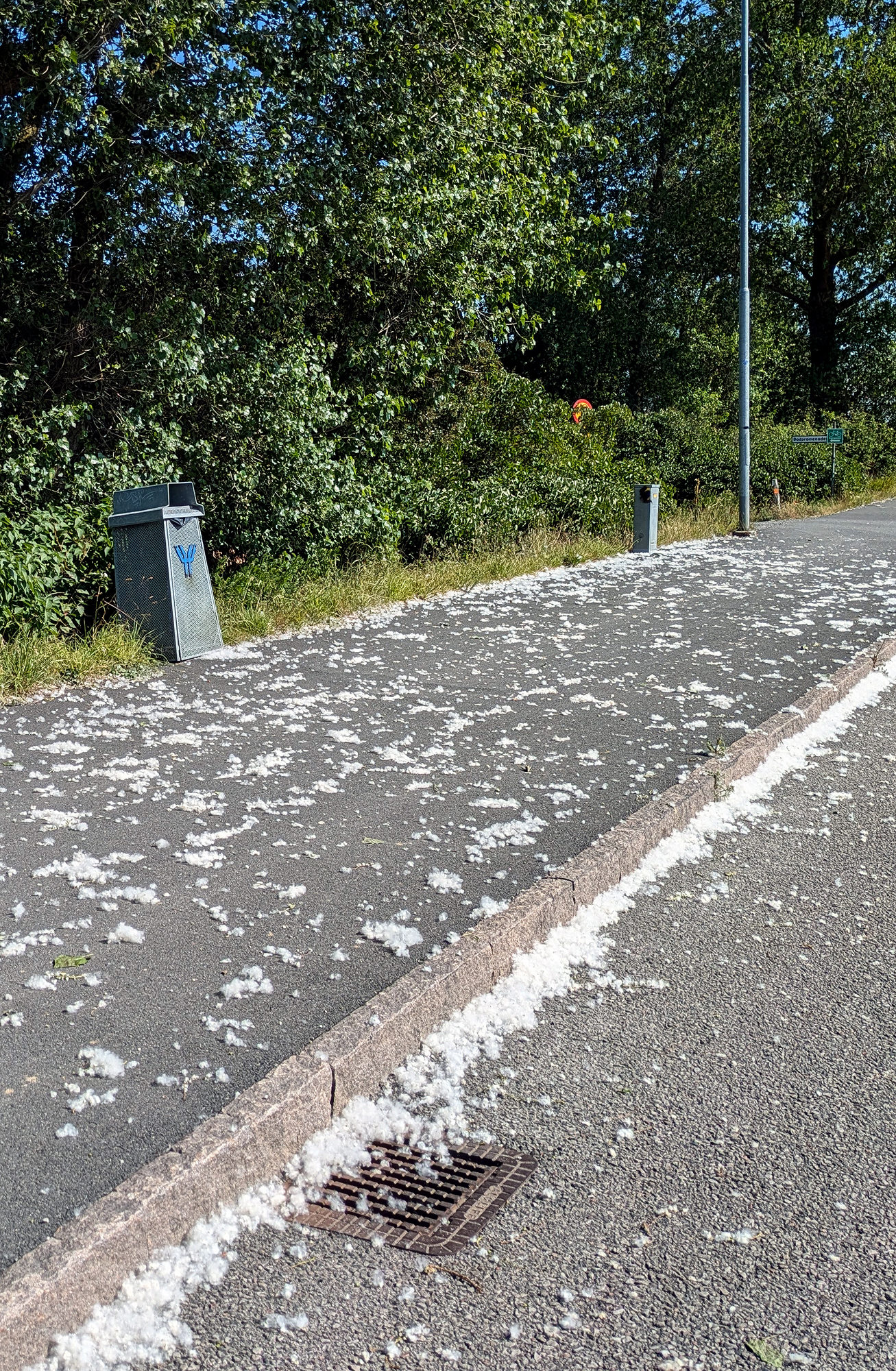
After flowering, the aspen seeds lie like snow on the ground.

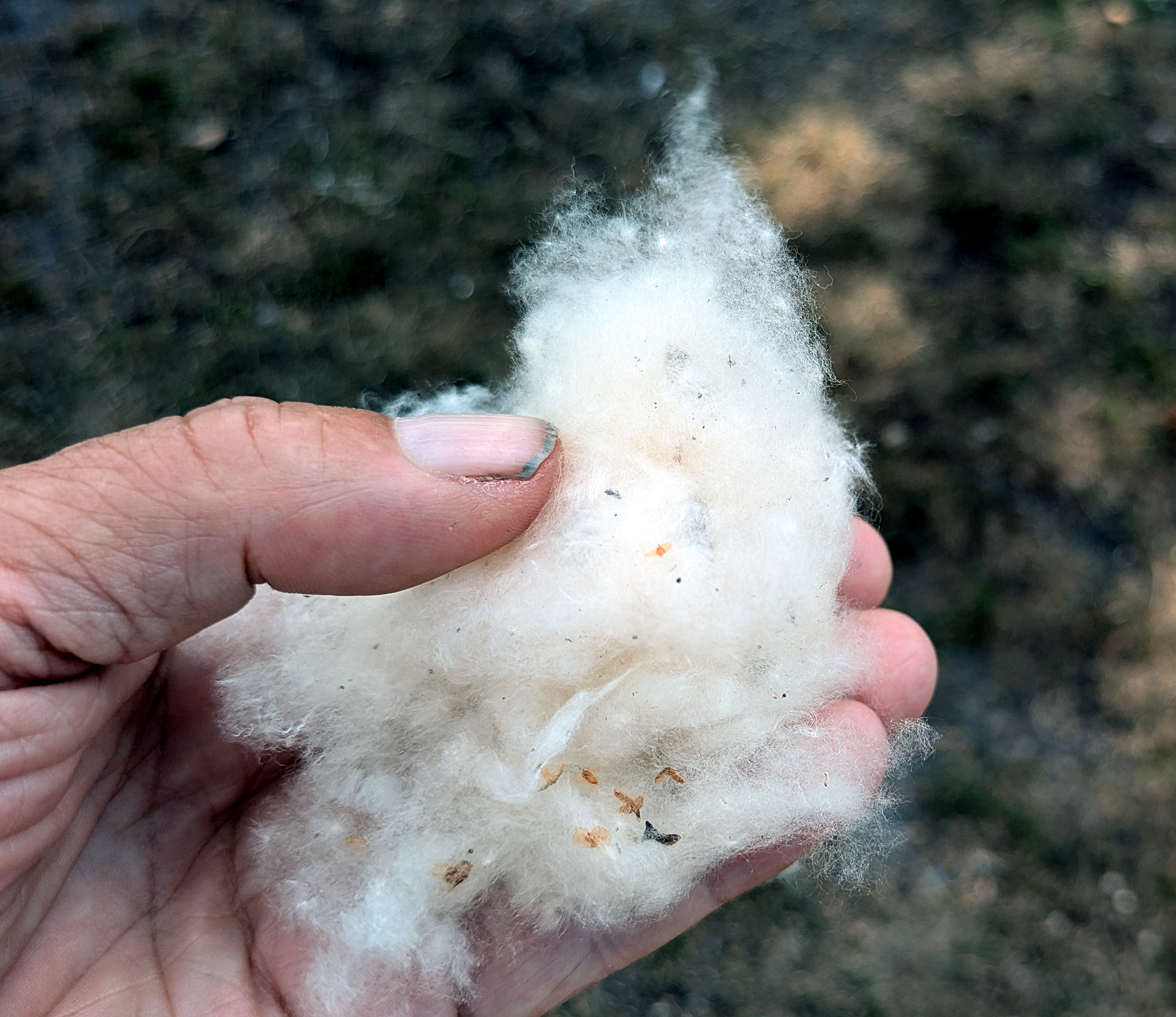
A bunch of aspen seeds, reminiscent of cotton.

Two aspens pictured in the coat of arms of the Haparanda Municipality

The hybrid with Populus alba (white poplar), known as grey poplar, Populus × canescens, is widely found in Europe and central Asia. Hybrids with several other aspens have also been bred at forestry research institutes in order to find trees with greater timber production and disease resistance (e.g. P. tremula × P. tremuloides, bred in Denmark).

== Use ==
The wood of aspen is light and soft with very little shrinkage. It is used for lumber and matches but is also valued in the pulp and paper industry, being particularly useful for writing paper. In addition, it is used for plywood and different types of flake and particle boards. Given its hardiness and capacity for rapid growth and regeneration, it plays an important role in the production of wood for renewable energy. Ecologically, the species is important as many insect and fungi species benefit from it. The tree further provides habitat for several mammals and birds that require young forests.
