= Termosolar Borges =

Solar thermal power plant

- Official name: Borges Termosolar
- Country: Spain
- Location: Les Borges Blanques, Lleida
- Coordinates: 41°31′41″N 0°48′22″E
- Status: Operational
- Construction began: March 2011
- Commission date: December 2012
- Construction cost: €153 million
- Owners: Abantia Group (47.5%); COMSA RENOVABLES (47.5%); Institut Català d’Energia (5%)

Solar farm
- Type: CSP
- CSP technology: Parabolic trough

Thermal power station
- Primary fuel: Biomass
- Secondary fuel: Natural gas
- Site area: 39 hectares (96 acres)
- Thermal capacity: 58 MW_{th} solar 102 MW_{th} all

Power generation
- Units operational: 2688
- Make and model: MAN SE
- Nameplate capacity: 22.5 MW
- Annual net output: 98 GW·h

Termosolar Borges (also known as Borges Termosolar) is a hybrid biomass-parabolic trough solar thermal power plant which provides electricity to Spain's transmission system. It is located about 100 kilometres (62 mi) west of Barcelona, about 10 kilometres (6.2 mi) south-east of Lleida, near Les Borges Blanques, Catalonia, Spain.

The plant is the northernmost concentrated solar plant built in Spain.

Construction has started February 2011 and the power plant was brought into operation in December 2012. and required between 150 and 450 people depending on the phase of creation. On a commercial scale, the plant is the first of its type: a solar parabolic trough plant with two biomass burners that integrate the solar production. The facility was developed by Abantia Group and COMSA EMTE. Owner is Borges Blanques, an Abantia Group (47.5%), COMSA RENOVABLES (47.5%) and Institut Català d’Energia (5%) joint venture. The facility is a €153 million investment. The plant employs 40 people in the operations and about 50 indirect jobs are engaged in the extraction and transport of biomass, over its 25-year lifetime.

The plant net power output is 22.5 megawatts (MW).

The facility combines solar power generation with biomass-fired power generation in a system that allows for continuous electrical production of renewable energy 24/7, even when the sun isn’t shining. The plant peak capacity of 22.5 MW_{e} is obtained when there is sufficient solar power. At night, when only the biomass power is available, the plant power capacity is 12 MW_{e}.

The facility is located on a 70 hectares (173 acres) site.

== History ==
Since the publication of the Spanish Royal Decree 661/2007, solar thermal energy plants were taken in consideration for development and several projects followed construction and operation. These Concentrated Solar Power (CSP) plants produce electricity by converting solar energy into high temperature heat using diverse mirror configurations. The heat is then used to produce electricity through a conventional generator system using a steam turbine. Currently, research is undertaken on various CSP technologies for storage of thermal energy to increase the number of operation hours of CSP plants. The Termosolar Borges plant implements a different approach: the hybridization of a CSP plant with biomass fueled boilers. There is also a natural gas burner, to be used as an emergency backup. This solution reaches a higher electric production, an improvement in the operation stability of the thermal system and a higher renewable output of the plant. Beside, the most solar projects and plants are developed in the southern Spain territory, in consideration of more daily energy and a better winter insolation. The hybridization technology compensates the lower winter season solar production in northern Spain. The hybridization of a CSP plant with biomass allows expanding this technology in northern Spain areas and opens the use of multiple renewable energy sources for the CSP plants.

== Design and specifications ==
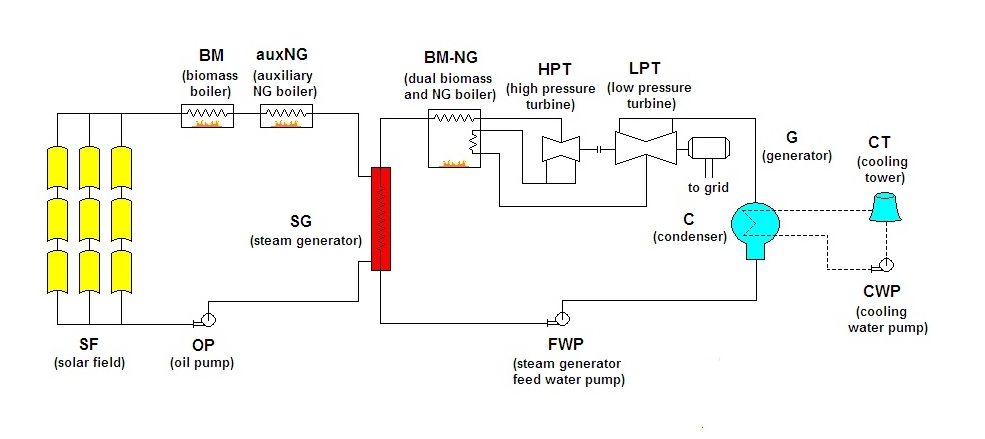
Schematic of the power plant

The thermosolar plant is mainly composed by 4 blocks: (1) the solar field; (2) the thermal block; (3) the electrical block and (4) the balance of the plant. The plant is to produce electricity on a continuous basis, round-the-clock.

=== Solar field ===
The solar field (SF) consists of trough-shaped mirror reflectors to concentrate solar radiation on to receiver tubes containing thermal transfer fluid which is heated to produce steam. The SF comprises 2,688 collectors, 5.5 metres (18 ft 1 in) in diameter and 12 metres (39 ft 4 in) long each, (224 loops or SCAs) and has been realized by Siemens, including the mirrors and solar receivers. The heat is transferred with a thermal oil loop.

=== Thermal block ===
It comprises two 22 MW_{th} dual biomass and natural gas boiler (BM-NG), one 6 MW_{th} natural gas conventional auxiliary boiler (auxNG) for assistance, and a steam generator (SG). The BM is inserted in series on the SF thermal oil loop. Gas firing is intended for power shaping and back-up.

=== Electric block ===
Composed of a 22.5 MW_{e} steam turbine generator train and a power transformer. The turbo generator train comprises one high-pressure turbine (HPT) followed by a low-pressure turbine (LPT). The electrical block converts the thermal energy in mechanical energy in the steam turbines followed by the generator which changes that into electricity.

=== Balance of the plant ===
That is the auxiliary systems, like shredding and biomass storage systems and control systems.

The plant is composed of a parabolic trough system with a thermal oil loop and in series two 22 MW_{th} dual biomass and natural gas combustion unit. Turbine full load efficiency is 37%. The plant is to produce electricity on a continuous basis, round-the-clock. Gas firing is available for back-up. The steam is provided to a MAN Diesel & Turbo SE turbo generator train. Carbon offset is 24,500 tonnes per year.

== Operations ==
While traditional solar power facilities need to employ expensive energy storage techniques to ensure continuous operation in all weather conditions, the biomass hybrid configuration has eliminated that need. Whenever there is not enough direct sunlight to generate solar power, the facility’s biomass power generation capacity is brought online, enabling the continuous production of electricity, even at night, when the sun isn’t shining.

The SF parabolic troughs absorb solar energy, heating a thermal oil up to 400 °C (752 °F). In a steam generator (SG) the thermal oil generates saturated steam at 40 bars (580 psi) and the dual biomass boiler superheat this steam to 520 °C (968 °F). When the solar portion of the plant is not operational (at night or when the sunlight is insufficient), the largest biomass boiler heats the thermal oil to 400 °C (752 °F). The fluid is then routed to the power plant block. The second biomass boiler overcomes the thermal oil 400 °C (752 °F) limit, heating the produced steam.

The biomass portion of the facility takes in timber and forestry waste as its primary feedstock. However, it can also be fueled in part with energy crops and agricultural residues. The planned biomass input is approximately 85,000 tonnes per year at 45% humidity, collected from an extended area in Catalonia, of forestry origin that comes from forests that are in an approximate radius of 80 kilometers of the plant.

At night or in completely cloudy days (long periods without radiation) the fuel used by the boilers will be the biomass. The total power of the biomass boilers is 36 MW_{th}. The choice of this power level for the boiler is motivated by being able to achieve at least 50% of the workload of the turbine running at night. Below this level, the turbine efficiency decreases sharply. The grate type biomass boilers from INTEC Energy Solutions are mainly composed of the following elements:

- Biomass feeding system
- Furnace for biomass
- Set of natural gas burners
- Heat recovery system (heat exchanger)

The functionality of the dual boiler is double; it can use biomass or natural gas as a fuel depending on the meteorological conditions.

About 2.5 MW of the gross power is taken for the shredding and storage of biomass.

The hybrid CSP plant has a small steam boiler for assistance. His steam generation capacity exceeds 3 tonnes/h at 15 bars (220 psi) to meet particular needs of the facility.

Electricity is produced using a MAN Diesel & Turbo MARC-R high-pressure steam turbine. The MARC-R is an interim heating turbine with two casings constructed out of a MARC-2 backpressure turbine and a MARC-6 condenser turbine, the MARC-R forms part of the MARC, short for Modular Arrangement Concept. The MARC-2 turbine operates in the 4-10 MW power range and accepts up to 90 bars (1,300 psi), 520 °C (968 °F) max steam inlet. The MARC-6 turbine operates in the 15-40 MW power range and accepts up to 121 bars (1,750 psi), 530 °C (986 °F) max steam inlet. The back pressure turbine discharges the steam into a pressurized piping system to be used for process heating elsewhere or as the supply to other turbines. For instance a turbine may receive steam at 40 bars (580 psi) and discharge into a 7 bars (100 psi) system. The condenser turbine has is discharge connected to a surface condenser to extend the range of pressure drop through the turbine to extract more power. The discharge pressure is a vacuum. The MARC-R group at full load efficiency is 37%.

Estimated yearly production is estimated in 44.1 GW·h from solar energy, in 47.3 GW·h from biomass production and in 10.2 GW·h from supplemental natural gas. Total production is 101.5 GW·h gross, 98 GW·h net. The facility combines solar power generation and biomass-fired power generation in a way that allows for continuous electrical production.

The hybridization model allows a continuous power generation, resulting in different ways of production, depending on the time of day, the weather and the season of the year. This installation just stops on summer nights, to not exceed the quota for biomass burning established by the regulations. During the hours with less solar radiation, as well as during the night, energy production is complemented by the biomass burners, supplied mainly with forest and from biomass energy crops. Natural gas, is used only as residual resource of support.

== Environmental impact ==
CSP-biomass hybrids have potential as an alternative to thermal energy storage in locations where full day power generation are required, and to ensure dispatchable energy supply for industrial processes and power generation. Hybridisation can reduce CST cost by making greater use of the turbine and generator component which is a large portion of a CST plant cost, and the use of biomass can also deliver economic and employment benefits in local economies. Termosolar Borges is located in a region rich in agriculture and horticulture providing a supply of biomass resource, and with a good quality solar resource.

The capacity of the plant is sufficient to provide ecofriendly power for about 27,000 Spanish households, avoiding 24,500 tonnes of CO_{2} emissions.

This kind of hybrid plants allows to deploy concentrated solar power in areas with lower solar radiation but with biomass resources available nearby.

A pilot project started in 2010 with the aim of studying the feasibility of poplar trees for biomass generation. Three different clones of poplar were cultured in the plantation of which one has proven to be viable for energy recovery through biomass boilers (heat). COMSA Medio Ambiente’s director of Engineering, Technology and Generation, Albert Solé, expressed his intent to use poplars to generate biomass for the plant.

Some sectors dispute the use of energy crops. Environmental groups like Greenpeace do not support every system for biomass production. Instead they propose that a very limited use is made to occupy the minimum territory for energy crops. Oxfam is another NGO who is not in favor of unsustainable biofuels and NGO Transport & Environment considers it as a bad biofuel because it entails increasing deforestation and increased pressure on food prices.

European Union’s member countries have not reached an agreement on the percentage of biomass that should come from energy crops, which is currently at 5%, as some like Lithuania propose to increase it to 7% while others such as Sweden and Finland are demanding a much lower percentage.

== See also ==
- List of power stations in Spain
- List of solar thermal power stations
- Renewable energy in the European Union
- Solar power in Spain
- Solar thermal energy
