= Energy forestry =

Forestry for production of biomass or biofuel

Energy forestry is a form of forestry in which a fast-growing species of tree or woody shrub is grown specifically to provide biomass or biofuel for heating or power generation.

The two forms of energy forestry are short rotation coppice and short rotation forestry:

- Short rotation coppice may include tree crops of poplar, willow or eucalyptus, grown for two to five years before harvest.
- Short rotation forestry are crops of alder, ash, birch, eucalyptus, poplar, and sycamore, grown for eight to twenty years before harvest.

== Benefits ==
The main advantage of using "grown fuels", as opposed to fossil fuels such as coal, natural gas and oil, is that while they are growing they absorb the near-equivalent of carbon dioxide (an important greenhouse gas) to that which is later released in their burning. In comparison, burning fossil fuels increases atmospheric carbon unsustainably, by using carbon that was added to the Earth's carbon sink millions of years ago. This is a prime contributor to climate change.

According to the FAO, compared to other energy crops, wood is among the most efficient sources of bioenergy in terms of the quantity of energy released by unit of carbon emitted. Other advantages of generating energy from trees, as opposed to agricultural crops, are that trees do not have to be harvested each year, the harvest can be delayed when market prices are down, and the products can fulfil a variety of end-uses.

Yields of some varieties can be as high as 11 oven dry tonnes per hectare every year. However, commercial experience on plantations in Scandinavia have shown lower yield rates.

These crops can also be used in bank stabilisation and phytoremediation. In fact, experiments in Sweden with willow plantations have proved to have many beneficial effects on the soil and water quality when compared to conventional agricultural crops (such as cereal). This beneficial effects have been the basis for the designed of multifunctional production systems to meet emerging bioenergy demands and at the same time, increase the local biodiversity, reduce soil erosion and nutrient emissions to water, increase soil carbon, enhance pollination, and avoid or mitigate flooding events.

== Problems ==
Although in many areas of the world government funding is still required to support large scale development of energy forestry as an industry, it is seen as a valuable component of the renewable energy network and will be increasingly important in the future.

Growing trees is relatively water intensive.

The system of energy forestry has faced criticism over food vs. fuel, whereby it has become financially profitable to replace food crops with energy crops. However, such energy forests do not necessarily compete with food crops for highly productive land as they can be grown on slopes, marginal, or degraded land as well – sometimes even with long-term restoration purposes in mind.

== See also ==
- Biofuel
- Biomass
- Energy crop
- Food vs. fuel
- Issues relating to biofuels
- Short rotation coppice
- Short rotation forestry
- Treethanol
