= Turanga (disambiguation) =

Tūranga — often rendered as Turanga — is a Māori language word meaning "stopping place." It may refer to:

- Tūranga, the main public library in Christchurch, New Zealand
- Tūranganui-a-Kiwa, the Māori name for Poverty Bay and pre-1870 name for Gisborne, New Zealand
- Turanga FM, the local radio station of iwi based in Tūranganui-a-kiwa
- Tūranga Creek, in Auckland, New Zealand
- Turanga (whare), the wharenui (meeting house) of Paranui marae, Himatangi, New Zealand

It may also refer to:

- The Turanga section of the genus populus, the subtropical poplars: Populus euphratica and Populus ilicifolia
- Turanga Leela, a fictional character from the animated television series Futurama
