= Abantia =

Abantia may refer to:

- ABANTIA, a Spanish engineering company
- Amantia, ancient Greek polis in Epirus
