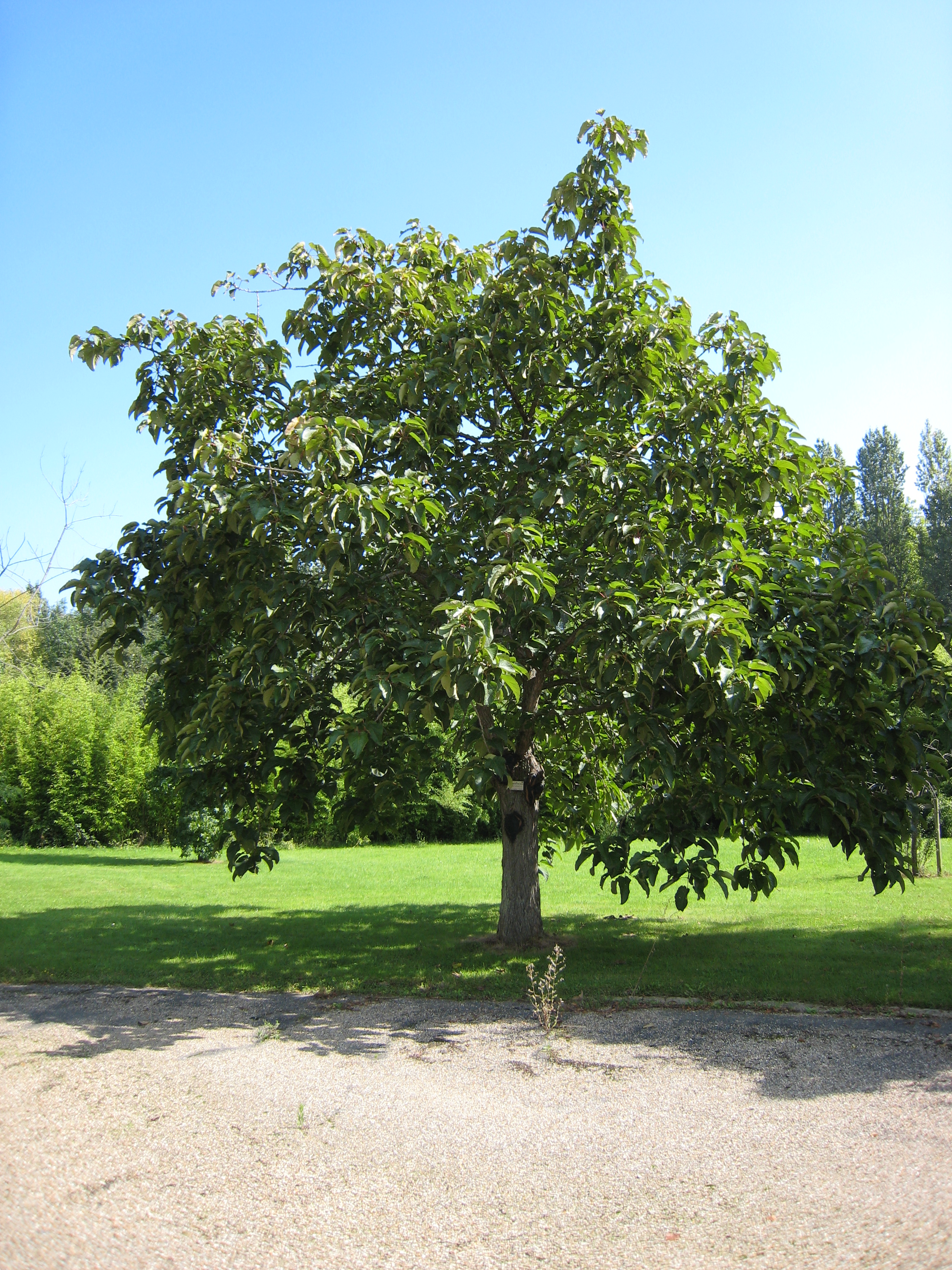

Scientific classification
- Kingdom: Plantae
- Clade: Tracheophytes
- Clade: Angiosperms
- Clade: Eudicots
- Clade: Rosids
- Order: Malpighiales
- Family: Salicaceae
- Genus: Populus
- Section: Populus sect. Leucoides
- Species: P. lasiocarpa

Binomial name
- Populus lasiocarpa Oliv.

= Populus lasiocarpa =

Species of plant

Populus lasiocarpa, commonly called the Chinese necklace poplar, is a species of poplar native to humid forests of China. It is closely related to Populus wilsonii, Wilson's poplar.

== Description ==
Populus lasiocarpa is known for its large leaves that may reach dimensions of 35 × 25 cm. The stalk reaches a length of 20 cm and the bottom sides of the leaves are very hairy. The buds have a length of 3 cm. Shoots are sturdy, angular and fluffy. The petals grow on 25 cm long catkins and produce round, woolly fruit.

This species blooms from March to May with the fruits ripening from May to June.

Wilson's poplar differs from it in that the former's leaves are not hairy underneath and are generally smaller with a flattened petiole and resinous buds.

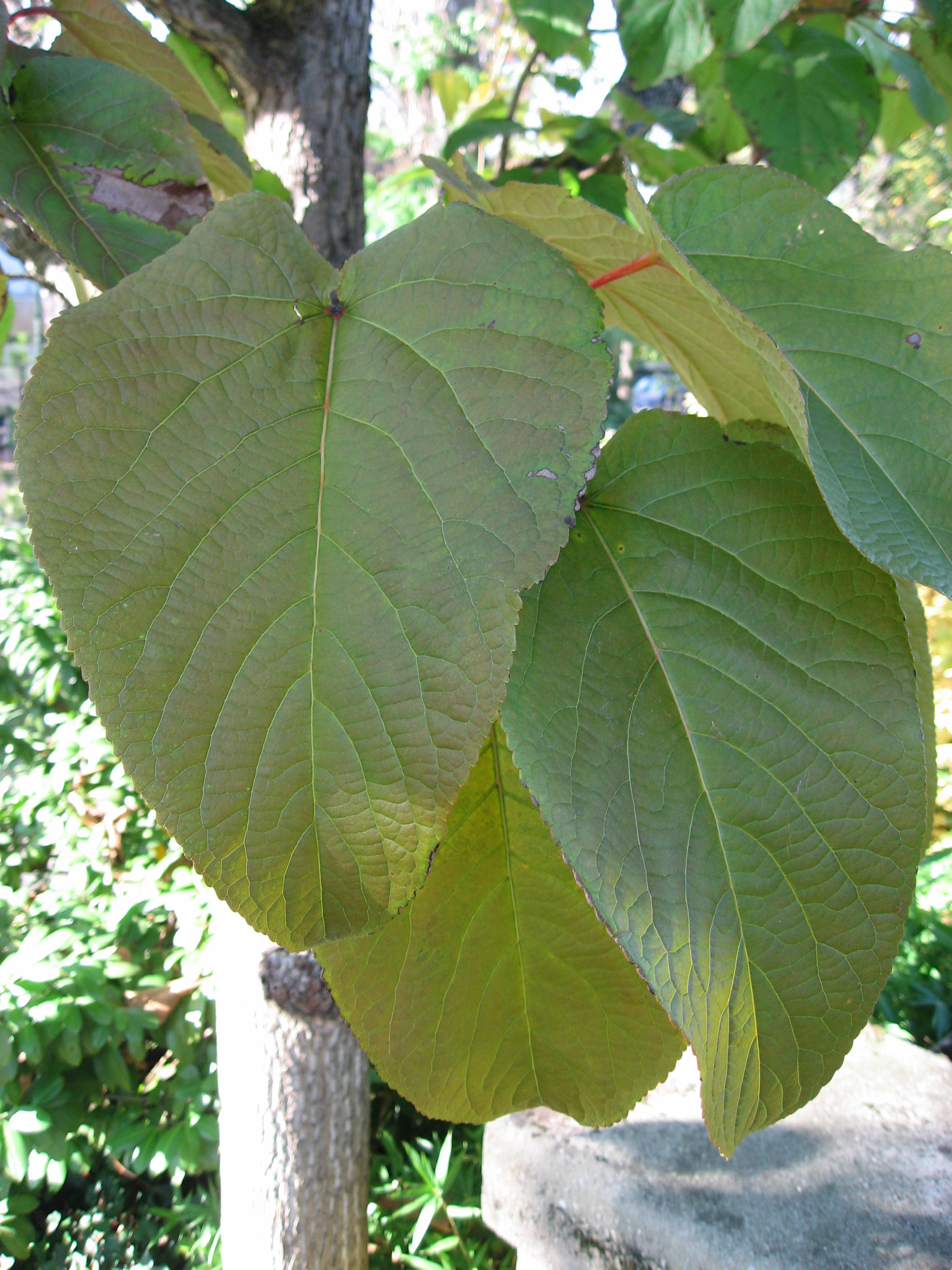
The leaves of P. lasiocarpa

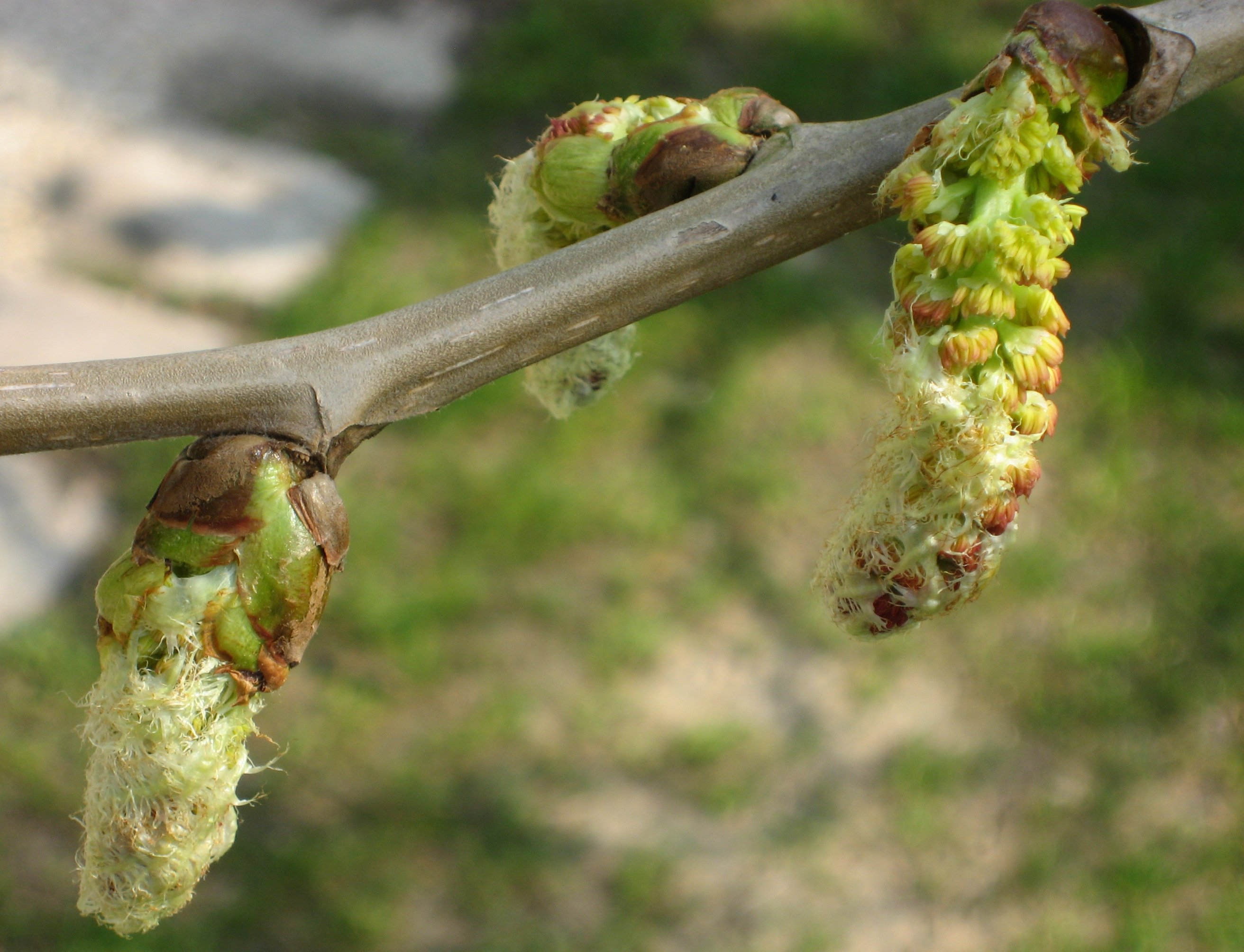
Male catkins

== Taxonomy ==
Populus lasiocarpa is a species of poplar in the family Salicaceae. It was first described by Daniel Oliver in 1890.

There are two known varieties:

- Populus lasiocarpa var. lasiocarpa with 15 to 24 cm long female and 1 to 1.7 cm long shortly-stalked fruit,
- Populus lasiocarpa var. longiamenta (P. Y. Mao & P. X. He) featuring up to 40 cm (16 in) long female catkins and 1.6 to 1.9 cm long stalkless fruit. This variety occurs in Yunnan at altitudes of 1,700 to 1,900 metres (5,600 to 6,200 ft).

== Distribution ==
The native distribution of Populus lasiocarpa comprises the temperate zones of China including the provinces of Guizhou, Hubei, Shaanxi, Sichuan and Yunnan. There it grows in species-rich forests on mountain slopes and river banks in altitudes of 1,300 to 3,500 metres (4,300 to 11,500 ft). It prefers fresh to moist clay soil which is lightly basic to alkaline, on sunny locations. The species thrives in warm temperatures but is most often winter-hardy.

== Use ==
The Chinese necklace poplar is an important log tree in its area of distribution. In Central Europe, the tree is often used as an ornamental plant but is of no distinct forestral importance.
