= Emte (disambiguation) =

Emte or EMTE was a Spanish industrial company (EMTA SA). It can also refer to:

- EMTÉ, a supermarket chain in the Netherlands
- EMTE (Eastern Machinery Trading Establishment), a Jordanian emergency vehicle and Refuse Collection Vehicle company
