= Short rotation forestry =

Energy crop for power stations

Short rotation forestry (SRF) is grown as an energy crop for use in power stations, alone or in combination with other fuels such as coal. It is similar to historic fuelwood coppice systems.

== Species used ==
SRF is the practice of cultivating fast-growing trees that reach their economically optimum size between 8 and 20 years old. Species used are selected on this basis and include alder, ash, southern beech, birch, Eucalyptus, poplar, willow, new varieties of Paulownia elongata, paper mulberry, Australian blackwood and sycamore.

== Planting and harvesting ==
Trees are planted at widths that allow for quick growth and easy harvesting. They are usually felled when they are around 15 cm wide at chest height, this takes from 8 to 20 years. This compares with 60 years or more for standard forestry crops. When felled, SRF trees are replaced by new planting or, more usually, allowed to regenerate from the stumps as coppice. The wood chip produced by SRF is preferred in the power industry as it does not contain bark and wood and is therefore more homogenous than wood chip provided by short rotation coppice. The profit after transport is estimated to be around €15 to €30 per tonne.

== Greenhouse gas impact ==
During growth SRF will offer significant carbon sequestration. The main carbon cost is associated with haulage of the harvested trees.

== Environmental impact ==
Some species may have a high water usage; this is especially important given changing water patterns due to climate change. There are also potential impacts on biodiversity, and the effects of large-scale SRF on flora and fauna are not known. When planned strategically, the use of short-rotation forestry can result in significant environmental benefits on soil, water and local biodiversity, while having a small impact on the food production.

== See also ==
- Biomass
- Bioenergy
- Energy forestry
- Nonfood crops
- Short-rotation coppice
- Wood fuel
