= Populus simaroa =

Conservation status
- Vulnerable (IUCN 3.1)

Scientific classification
- Kingdom: Plantae
- Clade: Tracheophytes
- Clade: Angiosperms
- Clade: Eudicots
- Clade: Rosids
- Order: Malpighiales
- Family: Salicaceae
- Genus: Populus
- Species: P. simaroa

Binomial name
- Populus simaroa Rzed.

Species of plant

Populus simaroa, the Balsas poplar, is a species of flowering plant in the family Salicaceae, native to central and southwestern Mexico. Unusually, it drops its leaves in the wet season and grows them out in the dry season. It may be conspecific with Populus guzmanantlensis.
