= COMSA EMTE =

Spanish construction and infrastructure engineering company

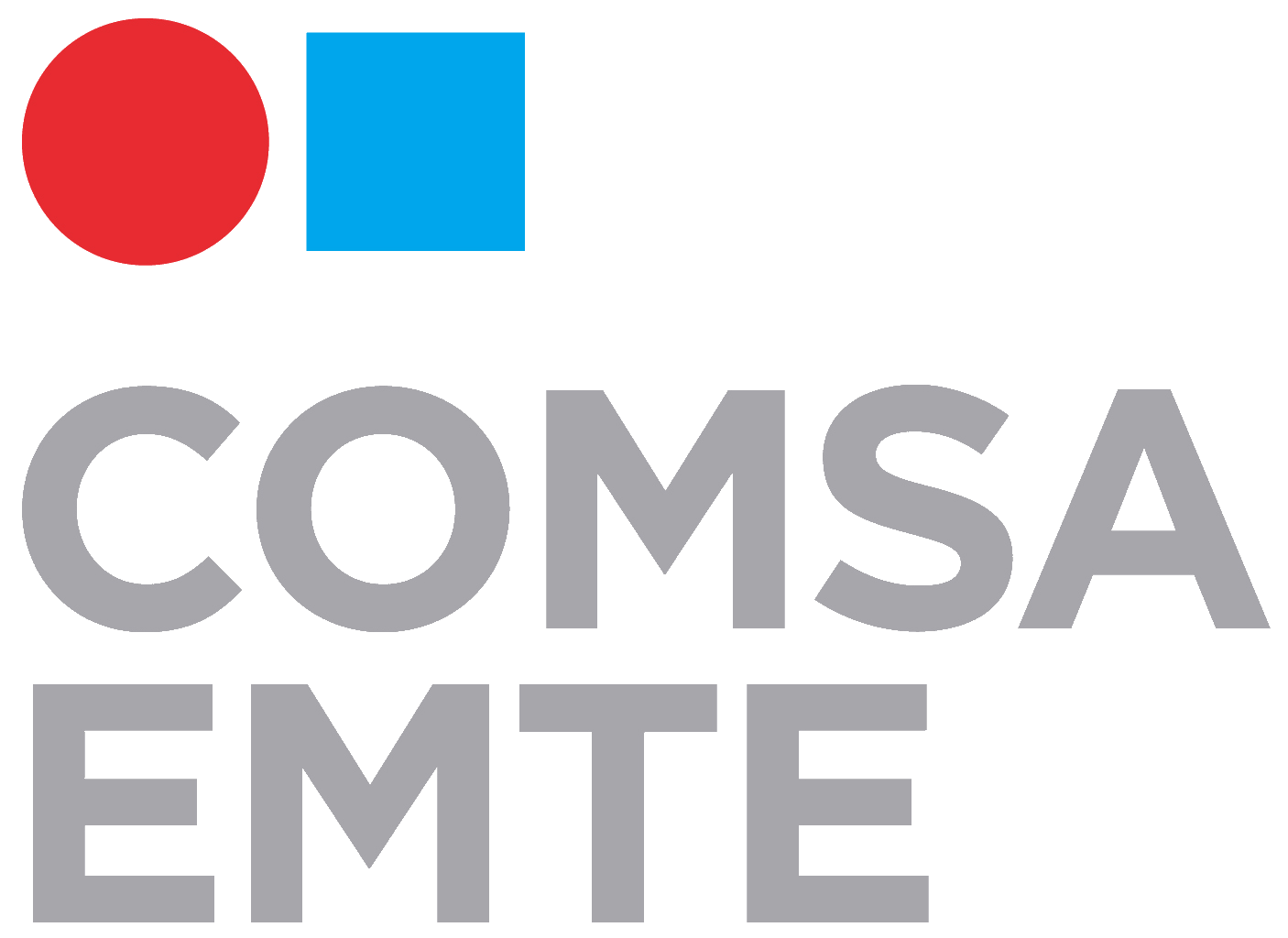
- Company type: Private
- Industry: Construction, Engineering
- Predecessor: Grupo COMSA; EMTE
- Founded: 2009; 17 years ago
- Headquarters: Barcelona, Spain
- Number of locations: 25
- Area served: Worldwide
- Key people: Jordi Miarnau (Chairman); Carles Sumarroca (CEO)
- Products: Construction and rail infrastructure Electrical, mechanical and systems engineering
- Net income: € 1,5 billion
- Number of employees: 8,500
- Website: comsaemte.com

COMSA EMTE was a Spanish construction and infrastructure engineering company specialising in road and rail transport infrastructure construction, electrical grid infrastructure, and general building construction.

== History ==
The company was formed in July 2009 by a merger of Spanish construction Grupo COMSA and electrical infrastructure construction company Emte SA.

It was renamed to COMSA Corporación in 2015.

== See also ==
- Termosolar Borges
