= Table of biodiesel crop yields =

The following table shows the vegetable oil yields of common energy crops associated with biodiesel production. Included is growing zone data, relevant to farmers and agricultural scientists. This is unrelated to ethanol production, which relies on starch, sugar and cellulose content instead of oil yields.

Crop	kg oil/ha/yr	litres oil/ha	lbs oil/acre	US gal/acre	Coldest hardiness zone	Warmest hardiness zone
maize (corn)	147	172	129	18	3	11
cashew nut	148	176	132	19	10	11
oats	183	217	163	23	3	10
lupin (lupine)	195	232	175	25	4	7
kenaf	230	273	205	29	6	10
calendula	256	305	229	33	9	11
cotton	273	325	244	35	8	11
hemp	305	363	272	39	8	11
soybean	375	446	335	48	2	11
coffee	386	459	345	49	10	11
flax (linseed)	402	478	359	51	3	10
hazelnuts	405	482	362	51	4	8
euphorbia	440	524	393	56	4	10
pumpkin seed	449	534	401	57	4	9
coriander	450	536	402	57	3	11
mustard seed	481	572	430	61	7	11
camelina	490	583	438	62	7	9
sesame	585	696	522	74	7	10
safflower	655	779	585	83	3	9
rice	696	828	622	88	9	10
tung tree	790	940	705	100	9	11
sunflowers	800	952	714	102	3	8
cacao (cocoa)	863	1026	771	110	11	13
peanut	890	1059	795	113	5	10
opium poppy	978	1163	873	124	3	9
rapeseed	1000	1190	893	127	9	13
olives	1019	1212	910	129	10	11
castor beans	1188	1413	1061	151	8	10
pecan nuts	1505	1791	1344	191	6	9
jojoba	1528	1818	1365	194	9	10
jatropha	1590	1892	1420	202	10	11
macadamia nuts	1887	2246	1685	240	9	11
brazil nuts	2010	2392	1795	255	11	13
walnut	2237	2413	1996	258	5	9
avocado	2217	2638	1980	282	9	11
coconut	2260	2689	2018	287	10	13
chinese tallow	3950	4700	3500	500	8	11
oil palm	5000	5950	4465	635	10	13
Copaifera langsdorffii	3670	4000	3300	400	3	4
Millettia pinnata	9000	5612	8030	600	11	13
algae (open pond)	80000	95000	70000	10000	7	13

- Note: Chinese Tallow (Sapium sebiferum, or Triadica sebifera) is also known as the "Popcorn Tree".

== Sources ==
- Used with permission from the Global Petroleum Club
- http://journeytoforever.org/biodiesel_yield.html

== See also ==
- Bioenergy in China
