= Short rotation coppice =

Coppice grown as an energy crop

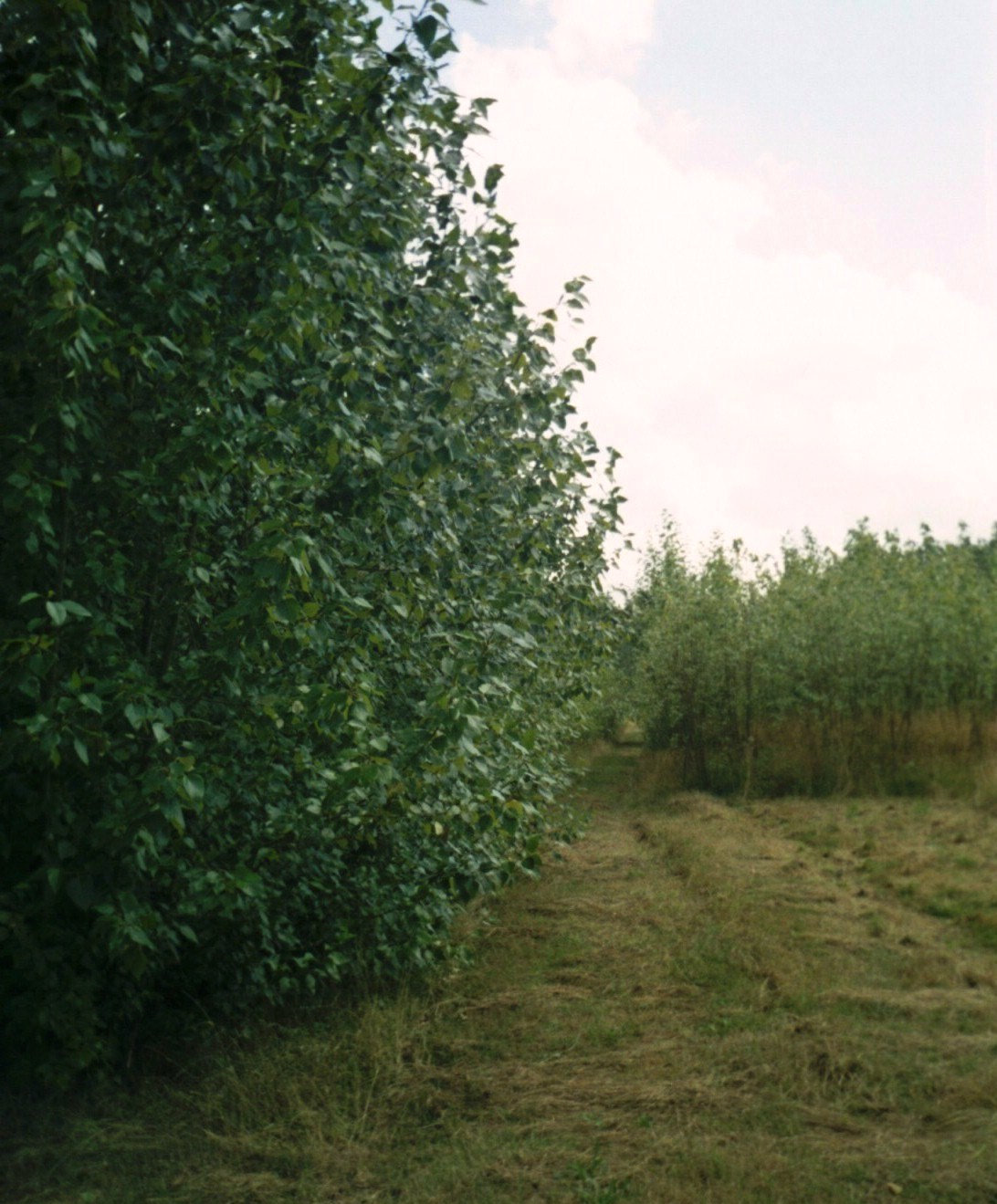
A field of coppiced poplar in Hampshire

Short rotation coppice (SRC) is coppice grown as an energy crop. This woody solid biomass can be used in applications such as district heating, electric power generating stations, alone or in combination with other fuels. Currently, the leading countries in area planted for energy generation are Sweden and the UK.

== Species used ==
SRC uses high-yield varieties of poplar and willow. Typically willow species chosen are varieties of the common osier or basket willow, Salix viminalis. Poplar is generally planted for visual variation rather than as a commercial crop, although some varieties can outperform willow on suitable sites.

Species are selected for their acceptance of varying climate and soil conditions, relative insusceptibility to pests and diseases, ease of propagation and speed of vegetative growth. To combat pests such as brassy and blue willow beetles, as well as the fungal pathogen Melampsora (a rust), planting a carefully selected mix of varieties is recommended. The management of the plantations highly affects productivity and success.

== Planting ==
SRC can be planted on a wide range of soil types from heavy clay to sand, including land reclaimed from gravel extraction and colliery spoil. Where used as a pioneer species the SRC yield may be smaller. Water availability to the roots is a key determinant for the success of the SRC.

Saplings are planted at a high density, as much as 15,000 per hectare for willow and 12,000 per hectare for poplar. Willow SRC can be established according to two different layouts. In most North European countries (Sweden, UK, Denmark) and in the US, the most frequent planting scheme is the double-row design with 0.75 m distance between the double rows and 1.5 m to the next double row, and a distance between plants ranging from 1 m to 0.4 m, corresponding to an initial planting density of 10,000–25,000 plants ha^{−1}. In other countries like Canada, a single-row design ranging from 0.33 m between plants on a row and 1.5 m between rows (20,000 plants ha^{−1}) to 0.30 m on the row and 1.80 m between rows (18,000 plants ha^{−1}) is more common. Planting takes place around March to take advantage of the high moisture of the soil in the spring and the amount of sunshine in the early summer. The most efficient planting machines plant four rows at a time and can plant a hectare in around three hours. Saplings are left to grow for one or two years and then coppiced.

The primary barrier to establishing plantations is the cost, as there is no financial reward for four years from a large initial investment. In the UK, however, grants are available to support establishment, and in Sweden an extensive scheme of subsidies was developed during 1991–1996, although reduced after that time.

== Harvesting ==
Harvests take place on a two- to five-year cycle, and are carried out in winter after leaf fall when the soil is frozen. The established root system and the nutrients stored in the roots and stumps guarantee vigorous growth for the shoots. A plantation will yield from 8 to 18 tonnes of dry woodchip per hectare per year. A plantation can be harvested for up to 20 years before replanting is needed.

When willow or poplar shoots are harvested as whole stems they are easy to store. The stems can be dried for combustion in a pile outdoors; the moisture content of the wood will decrease to about 30% on average until the next autumn. The stems can be cut further into billets that may not need to be chipped depending on use.

Where wood chip is being produced, it is most efficient to use direct-chip harvesters. These are heavy self-powered machines that cut and chip the shoots on a loading platform. Some can be attached to a normal tractor and a hectare can be harvested in around three hours. Direct chipping reduces costs as a separate chipping in the store will not be needed; however, the wood chip needs to be well stored to avoid composting. Harvesting poplar requires heavier machinery as it produces fewer and heavier stems.

The price of dry willow as a heating fuel is currently around 45 euro per tonne in most of Europe. This is not a relatively high-return crop, but it is low-maintenance and is a way of utilising difficult fields. Small-scale production can be combined with the production of material for wicker work. Correctly managed, there is little need for pesticides or treatments.

== Environmental impacts ==
=== Greenhouse gases ===
SRC has a low greenhouse gas impact as any carbon dioxide released in power generation will have been sequestered by the plantation over just a few years. Some carbon may also be stored in the soil; however, the extent of this carbon storage is dependent on the carbon content of the soil to begin with.

The carbon costs associated with SRC are: the planting, farming and chipping of the SRC plantation, generally done with fossil fuel-powered machinery; the crops require herbicides during establishment, fertiliser throughout growth, and occasional pesticide treatment – these chemicals require substantial amounts of energy and potential fossil fuel usage through manufacture. In general, the environmental contribution of the short-rotation plantations of willow can be considered positive for the environment when compared to other agricultural options, even when alternative energy uses are considered.

Willow and poplar SRC also offer an alternative use for intensely drained farmland. Decreasing drainage of these sites can support a positive impact on the CO_{2} balance. Use of a moist location could also avoid negative effects on the local water balance and sensitive ecosystems.

Electricity or heat from SRC provides between three and six times the CO_{2} reduction per pound that can be obtained from bioethanol from cereal crops. However, the reduction in CO_{2} emissions is slightly lower than grass energy crops such as Miscanthus grass due to higher maintenance costs.

=== Biodiversity ===
Good conservation management encouraging biodiversity can reduce the reliance on pesticides. Biomass Crops such as SRC willow show higher levels of biodiversity in comparison with intensive arable and grassland crops. SRC has a higher water consumption than agricultural crops. The root systems of SRC have a lower impact on archaeological remains than forestry but greater than agricultural crops such as wheat.

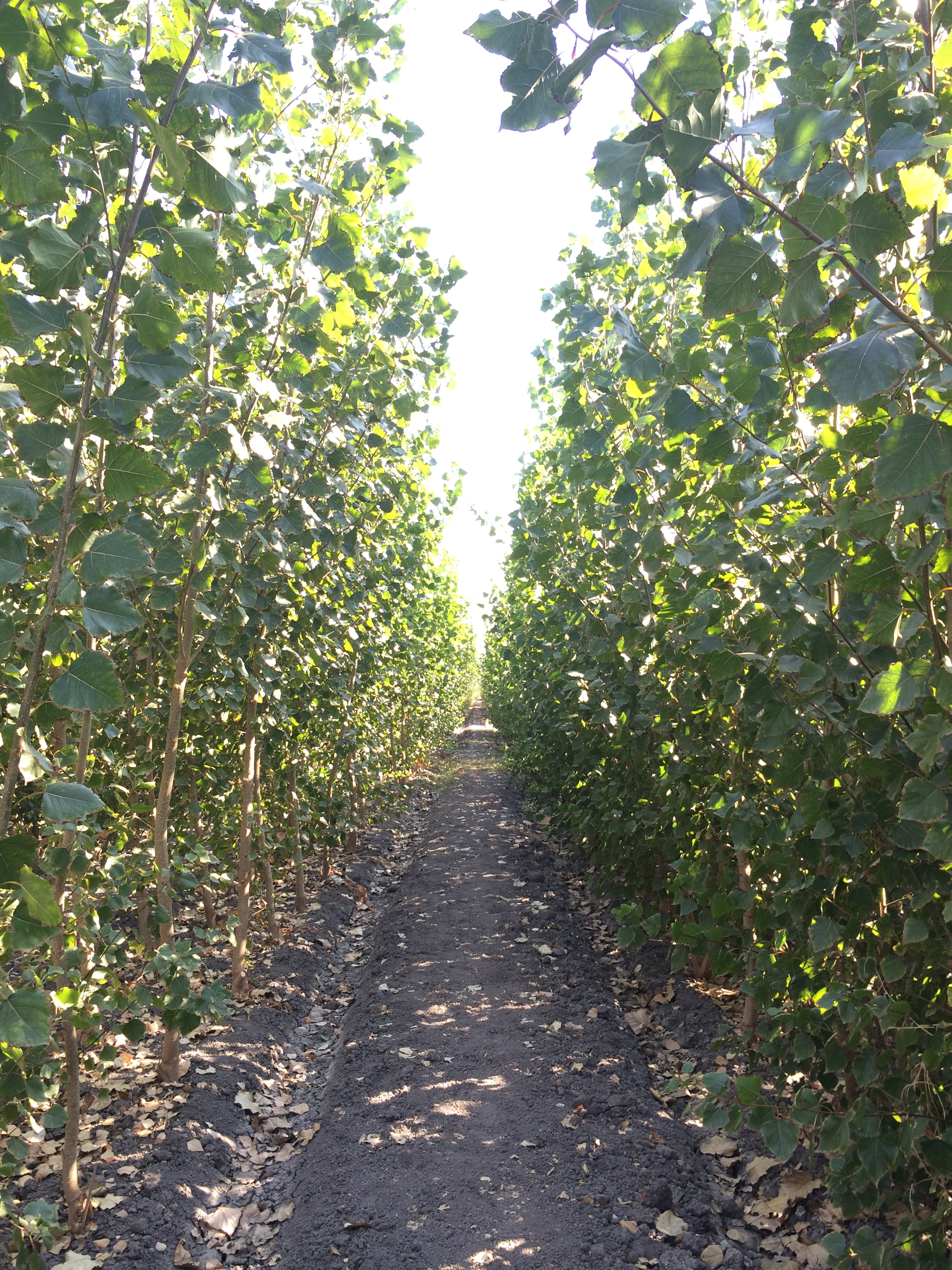
Biofuel SRC plantation in California

== Energy and biofuel generation ==
A power station requires around 100 hectares (1 km²) of SRC for 1 MW of power capacity. The current nature of the power industry generally requires flexibility in energy supply, which is incompatible with the long-term commitment SRC requires; however, there is much interest in SRC due to the need to reduce fossil carbon emissions. Grants may also be available in some jurisdictions to further this type of land use. The average annual net energy yields of a willow plantation are estimated at 175, 133, and 86 GJ/ha yr, and the (dimensionless) energy ratios are estimated at 19, 32, and 47, for N-high, N-medium, and N-zero, respectively. Thus, there is a trade-off between achieving a high net energy yield and achieving a high energy ratio.

Enköping (Sweden) established a successful model that combines heat generation from biomass, SRC and phytoremediation. The municipality manages about 80 ha of willow plantations that are used in the district heating plant. These plantations are concurrently used as a green filter for water treatment, improving the functionality and efficiency of the whole system.

Biofuel is another option for using SRC as a bioenergy supply. In the United States, scientists studied converting SRC poplar into sugars for biofuel (e.g. ethanol) production. Considering the relatively low price, the process of making biofuel from SRC can be economically feasible, although the conversion yield from SRC (as juvenile crops) was lower than from regular mature wood. Besides biochemical conversion, thermochemical conversion (e.g. fast pyrolysis) was also studied for making biofuel from SRC poplar and was found to have higher energy recovery than that from bioconversion.

== Environmental uses ==
Short-rotation coppice has recently gained importance in many countries as a means of providing additional environmental benefits. Some species, such as poplar and willow, have been successfully used for soil and sludge trace element phytoextraction, and for groundwater and sewage wastewater rhizofiltration.

== See also ==
- Energy forestry
- Nonfood crops
- Short rotation forestry
- Switchgrass
- Wood fuel
