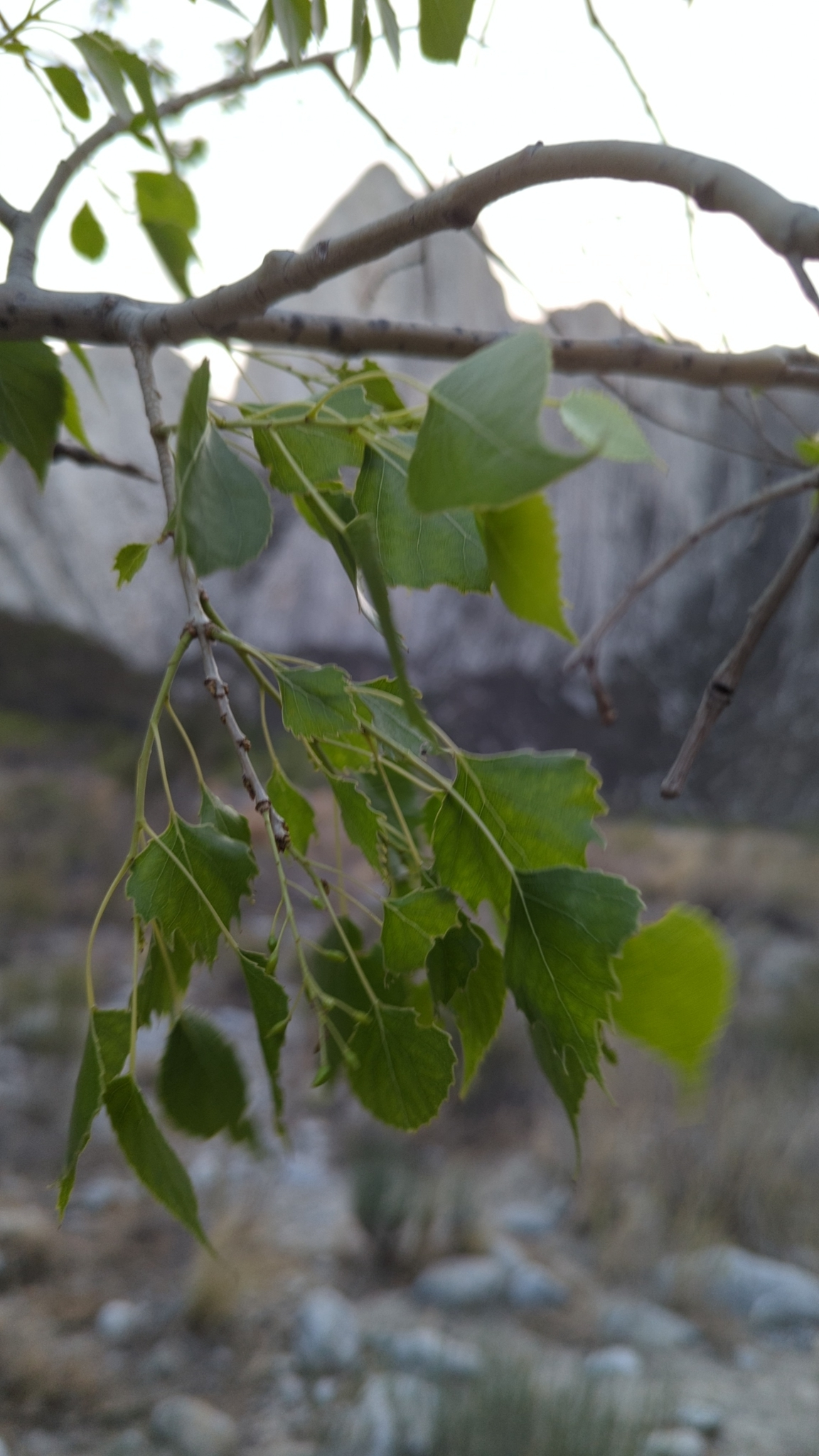
- Foliage
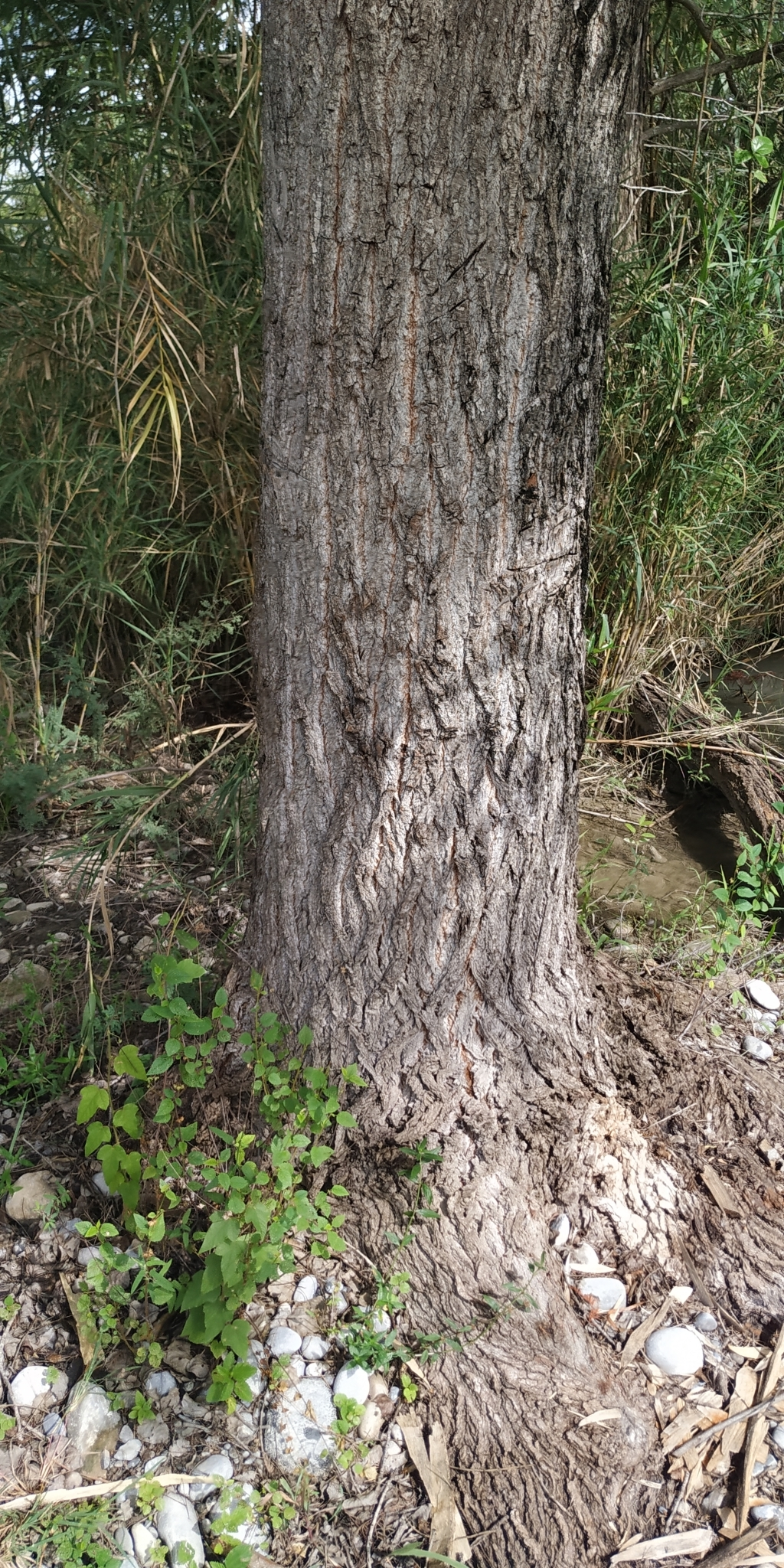
- Trunk

Conservation status
- Near Threatened (IUCN 3.1)

Scientific classification
- Kingdom: Plantae
- Clade: Tracheophytes
- Clade: Angiosperms
- Clade: Eudicots
- Clade: Rosids
- Order: Malpighiales
- Family: Salicaceae
- Genus: Populus
- Species: P. mexicana

Binomial name
- Populus mexicana Wesm.

Synonyms
- Balsamiflua mexicana (Wesm.) N.Chao & G.T.Gong; Balsamiflua mexicana subsp. dimorpha (Brandegee) N.Chao & G.T.Gong; Populus dimorpha Brandegee

= Populus mexicana =

Species of plant

Populus mexicana, the Mexican poplar, is a species of flowering plant in the family Salicaceae, native to Mexico. A fast-growing tree reaching 30 m (100 ft), it typically grows along watercourses.

== Subtaxa ==
The following subspecies are accepted:

- Populus mexicana subsp. dimorpha (Brandegee) Eckenw. – northwestern Mexico
- Populus mexicana subsp. mexicana – Mexico
