= Treethanol =

Treethanol is an ethanol fuel (more precisely cellulosic ethanol) made from trees.

== Summary ==
The biofuel is a contender in the race to find an energy alternative to fossil fuels. Proponents of Treethanol claim that its energy yield is higher compared to the energy required for production when compared with more common sources of ethanol i.e. sugar cane and corn.

== Production ==
Cellulosic ethanol is produced using the lignocellulose biomass that comprises much of the mass of plants. Essentially at the core of the plant material is cellulose, which can be broken down into simple carbohydrate sugars. After these sugars have been extracted, they can be then be fermented into an alcohol, which is known as ethanol. The most widely used and promising means of creating cellulosic ethanol is called the cellulolysis process. The process consists of hydrolysis on pretreated lignocellulosic materials. Then enzymes are used to break down cellulose into glucose. This glucose is then fermented and distilled. The pretreatment step mentioned above is necessary when processing cellulosic ethanol because the glucose (sugars) are not readily accessible as they are with other ethanol sources such as corn or sugar cane. Rather, the cellulose in wood must be separated from the encapsulating hemicellulose and lignin.

There are three types of pretreatment: physical, chemical, and biological. Physical treatment involves physically reducing wood particle size. This can be accomplished through chipping, grinding, etc. Biological treatments involve the use of microorganisms to break down the wood. This type is considered favorable to physical pretreatments because it consumes far less energy in comparison, but the biological method has not proven to be scalable to an industrial level. The chemical method utilizes an alkaline or otherwise acidic medium to make the cellulose within wood fibers more accessible. This has shown to be the most efficient and has the lowest energy cost.

Forest trees make up more than 90% of the total terrestrial biomass while performing functions such as carbon sequestration, producing oxygen, and promoting biodiversity. Trees are a promising source of ethanol because they grow all year round, require significantly less fertilizer and water and contain far more carbohydrates (the chemical precursors of ethanol) than food crops (like corn) do.

== Sources ==
Poplar, Willow, and Eucalyptus tree are emerging as favorites in the process of creating Treethanol. This is due to their ability to grow at a fast rate in many parts of the world.

== Applications ==
Treethanol is not an energy source that promises to power houses in the future, but rather it can be taken advantage of in applications where combustion engines are used. Approximately 85% of US energy consumption is produced from fossil fuels such as natural gas, coal, and oil. With China, India, and other rapidly developing nations increasing their demand for fossil fuels, the world’s total energy use is expected to grow by 57% over the next 20 years. It is estimated that the U.S. alone uses 140 billion gallons of fuel per year for transportation alone. Not only can Treethanol be mixed with ordinary fuels, it can also be burned directly in modified engines to greatly reduce greenhouse gas emissions.

== Advantages ==
Cellulosic ethanol is a renewable transportation fuel (likewise to other forms of ethanol) that can be produced from forest biomass. Trees, particularly, are a promising feedstock as they grow all year round, requiring less fertiliser and water than food crops, while also containing a high proportion of carbohydrates, the chemical precursors to ethanol. Compared with corn ethanol, cellulosic biofuel generally require less fertilizers, pesticides, energy, or water to grow. Production can, in principle, be expanded by growing more trees, although this takes time.

The development of all types of biofuel, including Treethanol can be of importance for countries looking to decrease their dependence on petroleum, especially those countries that import most of their petroleum and also have plenty of crop/forest land such as New Zealand and Sweden.

An important issue is whether Treethanol is a superior alternative to more common forms of ethanol like corn based. The general consensus in an article by Hoover, F., & Abraham, J. (2009), is that most forms of cellulosic ethanol have the potential to yield higher energy outputs and be more sustainable than corn ethanol. They also note that while cellulosic ethanol does not necessarily yield more energy than say, corn based ethanol per unit of measurement, it requires far less energy inputs to produce which could give it a far higher net energy yield at the end of processing. The findings that lignocellulosic biomass has a far greater productivity yield than traditional biofuel sources is supported by Papini, A., & Simeone, M. (2010).

Responsible forestry practices do not contribute to greenhouse gases because the forest is allowed to regenerate following fiber harvesting. For this reason wood can be considered to be an essentially carbon-neutral source of energy.

== Drawbacks ==
While it seems reasonable that Treethanol could be an alternative to current ethanol types, it has one flaw, which is the extra processing needed to break down the tough cellulose and hemicellulose within the walls of the cell to isolate the sugars. As discussed above in the production section, creating ethanol from the lignocellulose found in tree biomass requires the extra step of “pre-treatment”. It is this pre-treatment that still requires too much energy to make the Treethanol worth the effort.

That being said, many believe that the potential pros far out-weigh the short-term cons. The process of growing the tree biomass is energy efficient compared with growing corn or sugar cane for ethanol. However, it also takes longer to grow trees than to grow corn, and so any accurate research on sustainability and crop rotation (even for fast growing trees) requires a long time commitment, which up to now has been hard to find. It has been estimated that this process, including the building of processing plants and then refining of the growing and processing stage could take at least a decade.

Another drawback to the processing of cellulosic ethanol is that there is little known about the waste/by products from the processing. Of particular concern to some is the biological method of pre-treatment. It is estimated that there is the possibility of producing almost as much (if not more) waste than usable ethanol, with waste products including mold, bacteria, yeast, biological toxins and allergens produced by these microorganisms, enzymes, and other chemicals.

== See also ==
- Ecology
- Environmental protection
- Habitat conservation
- Natural resource
- Renewable resource
- Sustainability
