= Populus guzmanantlensis =

Conservation status
- Endangered (IUCN 3.1)

Scientific classification
- Kingdom: Plantae
- Clade: Tracheophytes
- Clade: Angiosperms
- Clade: Eudicots
- Clade: Rosids
- Order: Malpighiales
- Family: Salicaceae
- Genus: Populus
- Species: P. guzmanantlensis

Binomial name
- Populus guzmanantlensis A.Vázquez & Cuevas

Species of plant

Populus guzmanantlensis is a species of plant in the family Salicaceae. It is endemic to Mexico. This species is native to the Sierra de Manantlán of Jalisco.
