= Populus ilicifolia =

Conservation status
- Vulnerable (IUCN 2.3)

Scientific classification
- Kingdom: Plantae
- Clade: Tracheophytes
- Clade: Angiosperms
- Clade: Eudicots
- Clade: Rosids
- Order: Malpighiales
- Family: Salicaceae
- Genus: Populus
- Species: P. ilicifolia

Binomial name
- Populus ilicifolia (Engl.) Rouleau

Synonyms
- Celtis ilicifolia Engl.; Balsamiflua ilicifolia (Engl.) Kimura; Tsavo ilicifolia (Engl.) Jarm.; Turanga ilicifolia (Engl.) Kimura; Balsamiflua denhardtiorum (Engl.) Kimura; Populus denhardtiorum Dode; Populus euphratica subsp. denhardtiorum Engl.

Species of tree

Populus ilicifolia, the Tana River poplar, is a species of poplar in the family Salicaceae. It is found in Kenya and Tanzania from 1°N to 3°S latitude, 37°E to 41°E latitude, at altitudes of 10–1,200 m; it is the southernmost member of its genus in the world. It is threatened by habitat loss. It requires a riverine climate.

It is an evergreen tree growing to 30 m tall with a trunk up to 1.5 m diameter. It is used locally as an avenue tree, and its timber is used for making beehives, mortars, dugout canoes and fences.
