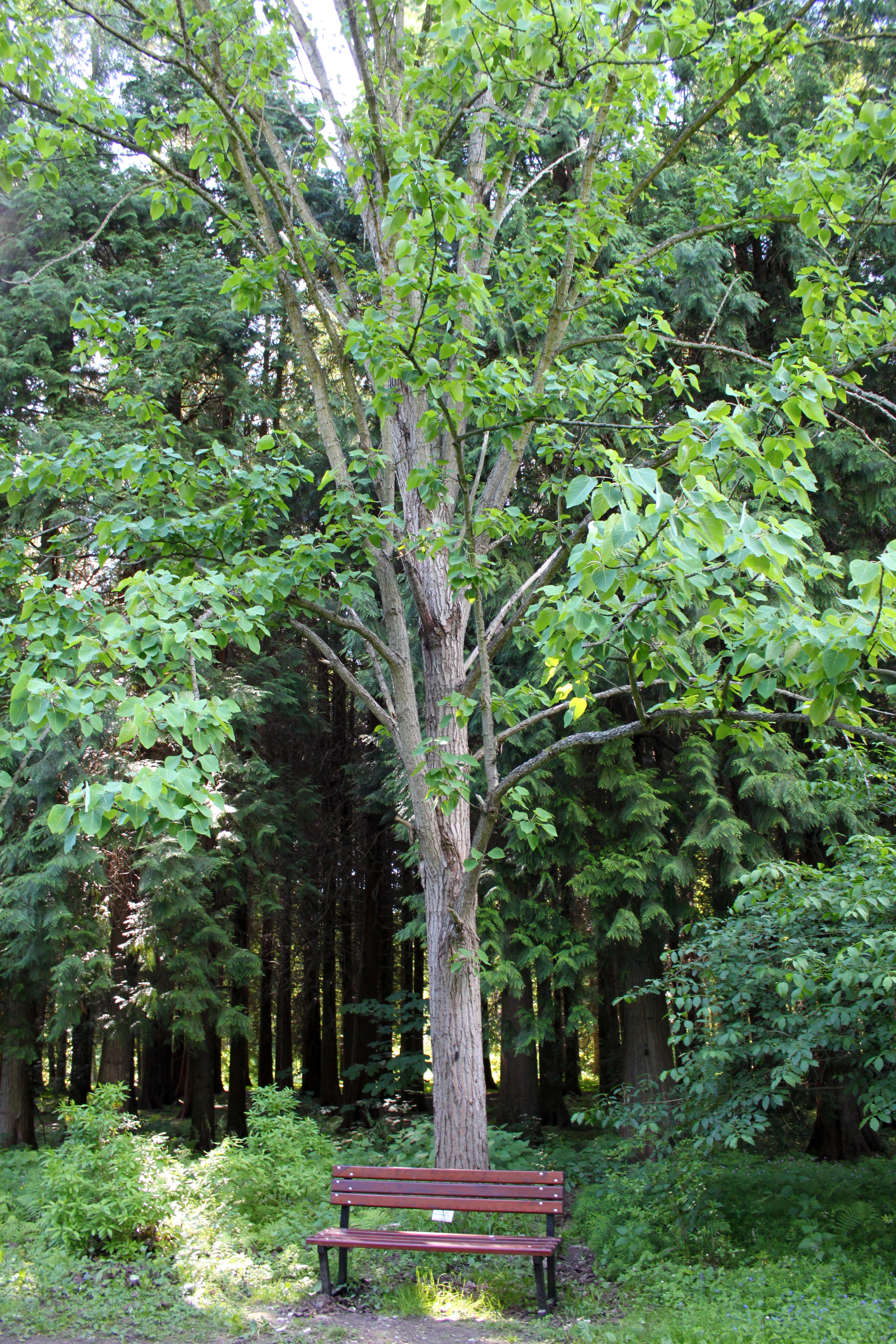

Scientific classification
- Kingdom: Plantae
- Clade: Tracheophytes
- Clade: Angiosperms
- Clade: Eudicots
- Clade: Rosids
- Order: Malpighiales
- Family: Salicaceae
- Genus: Populus
- Section: Populus sect. Leucoides
- Species: P. wilsonii

Binomial name
- Populus wilsonii C.K.Schneid.

= Populus wilsonii =

Species of plant

Populus wilsonii, or Wilson's poplar, is a species of deciduous poplar tree found in China's Gansu, Hubei, Shaanxi, Sichuan, Xizang and Yunnan provinces. The tree has elliptical leaves wider at the base than at the tip, and can grow to up to 25 metres in height with a diameter at breast height of 1.5 metres. Flowering occurs from April to May, and fruiting begins in May and lasts until June.
