= Estudios, Montajes y Tendidos Eléctricos =

Spanish industrial engineering company

EMTE SA
- Industry: Electrical engineering
- Founded: 1961
- Founder: Jaume Rosell i Sanuy
- Defunct: 2009; 17 years ago
- Fate: Merged with Grupo COMSA
- Successor: COMSA EMTE
- Headquarters: Barcelona, Spain
- Products: Electrical transmission systems
- Revenue: turnover (millions): €161.97 (2003) €400.3 (2005) €493.0 (2006) €618.6 (2007) €711.9 (2008)
- Number of employees: 1310 (2003)

EMTE SA (an acronym for "Estudios, Montajes y Tendidos Eléctricos") was a Spanish industrial engineering group specialising in industrial electrical installations and control systems. The company also provided a variety of industrial installations including waste and waste water management, climate control, telecommunications, and automated painting and welding.

== History ==
EMTE was founded as an electrical generation and installation company in 1961. In 1970 the company was renamed EMTE, and became a public company. The company diversified into general electromechanical and low voltage (mains) installations, then in the 1980s the company developed industrial control systems, electronics and telecommunications, and expanded throughout Spain. In the 1990s the company began developing turnkey waste treatment plants, and later entered into the renewal energy business.

In 2003 Aguas the Barcelona (Agbar) acquired a 35% share in the group, with an agreement to raise its share to 50% by 2006 and to integrate its ADAS Systems, Aquatec, AQUAPLAN Agbar and maintenance operations in Emte. Agbar's shareholding increased to 50% in April 2004. In December 2006 Agbar announced that it was to sell its 50% share in Emte for €107.3million to the Sumarroca group increasing its original 17% share to 67%. The remaining shares from the 1961 founder of the company were also acquired by Sumarocca. The holding company 'Solduga SA' was created by the Sumarroca family for the acquisition. In 2007 Banco Sabadell and Caja Madrid became shareholders.

In 2009 Sumarroca's share was 60% and Banco Sabadell and Caja Madrid both had taken 20% stakes.; in May 2009 Emte agreed to merge with the construction and infrastructure group Comsa to form COMSA EMTE in a 70:30 shareholding distribution (Comsa shareholders 70%).

== Company structure ==
In 2009 the group was divided into five sectors, each composed of several companies:

- Instalaciones eléctricas (electrical installations) - installation and maintenance of electrical generators, substations, power cables and related equipment, railway electrification
- Sistemas y Tecnología (systems and technology) - Telecommunications and remote control and sensing
- Mantenimiento y Servicios (maintenance and service) - management and maintenance of facilities
- Instalaciones mecánicas (mechanical installations) - climate control, fire control systems, clean room and biosecurity
- Medio Ambiente (environment) - turnkey plants for waste treatment and recycling, waste gasification, renewable energy.
