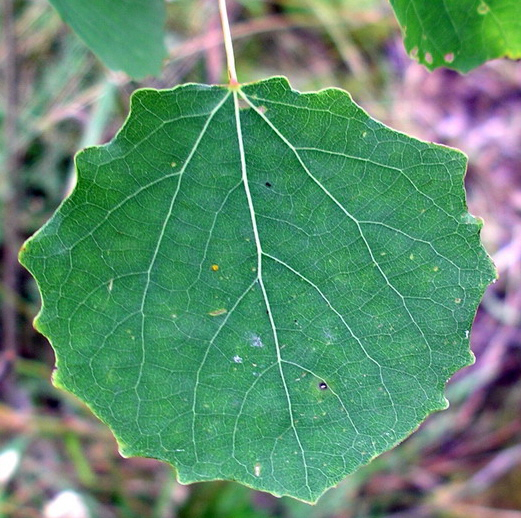
- Leaf of Populus tremula

Scientific classification
- Kingdom: Plantae
- Clade: Tracheophytes
- Clade: Angiosperms
- Clade: Eudicots
- Clade: Rosids
- Order: Malpighiales
- Family: Salicaceae
- Subfamily: Salicoideae
- Tribe: Saliceae
- Genus: Populus; L.

Type species
- Populus tremula L.

Sections and species
- See text

Synonyms
- Aigiros Raf.; Balsamiflua Griff.; Leuce Opiz; Monilistus Raf.; Octima Raf.; Tacamahaca Mill.; Tremula Dumort.; Tsavo Jarm.; Turanga (Bunge) Kimura

= Populus =

Populus Temporal range: 66–0 Ma

Genus of plants

Populus is a genus of over 60 species of deciduous flowering plants in the family Salicaceae, native to temperate, subarctic, and montane regions of Eurasia, North America, and North Africa, and to the tropical highlands of East Africa. English names variously applied to different species include poplar (/ˈpɒplə/), aspen, and cottonwood.

The western balsam poplar (P. trichocarpa) was the first tree to have its full DNA code determined by DNA sequencing, in 2006.

== Description ==
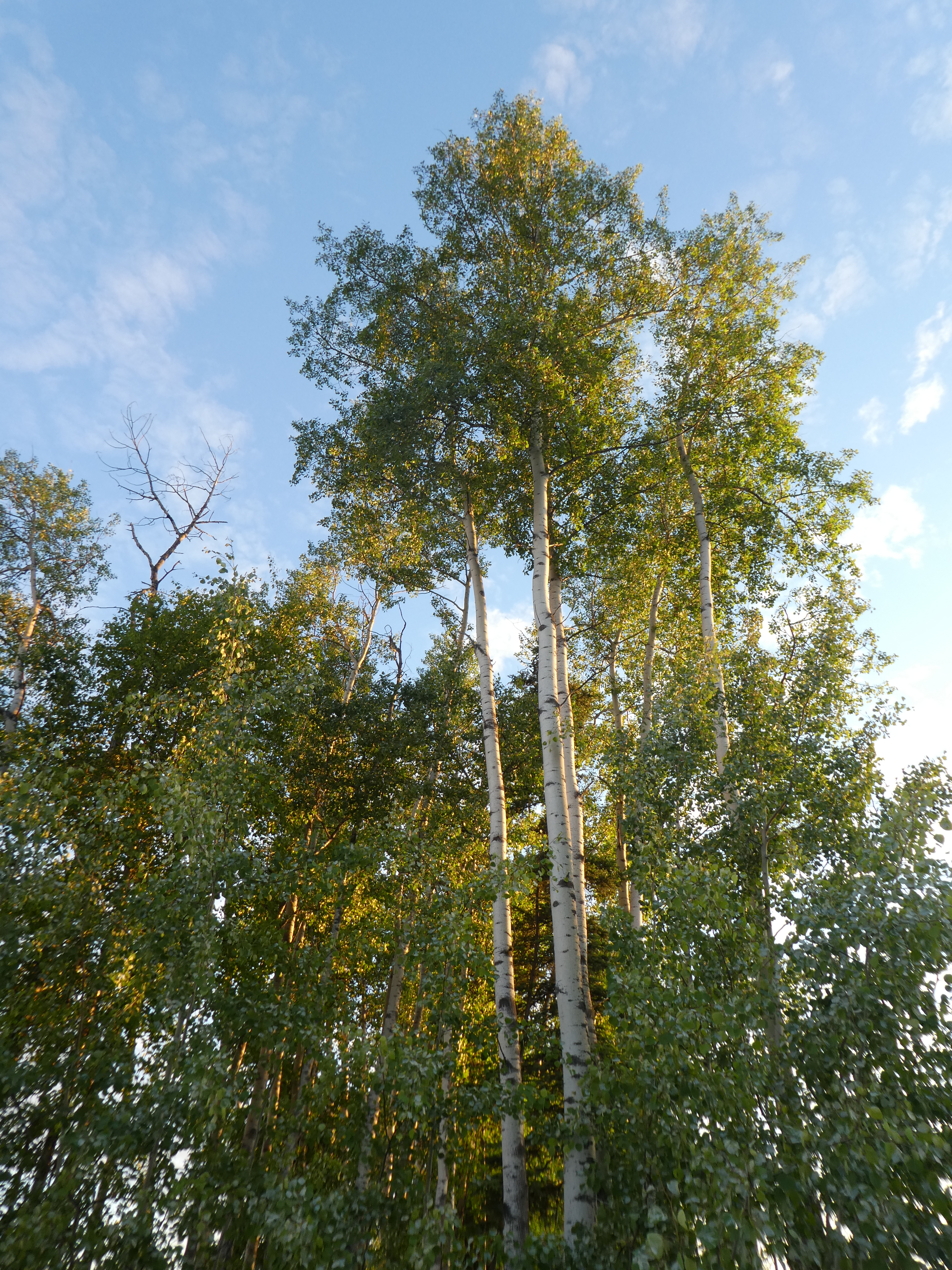
Mature trembling aspen trees (P. tremuloides) with young regeneration in foreground, Alaska

The genus has a large genetic diversity, and can grow from 15–50 m (49–164 ft) tall, with trunks up to 2.5 m (8 ft) in diameter.

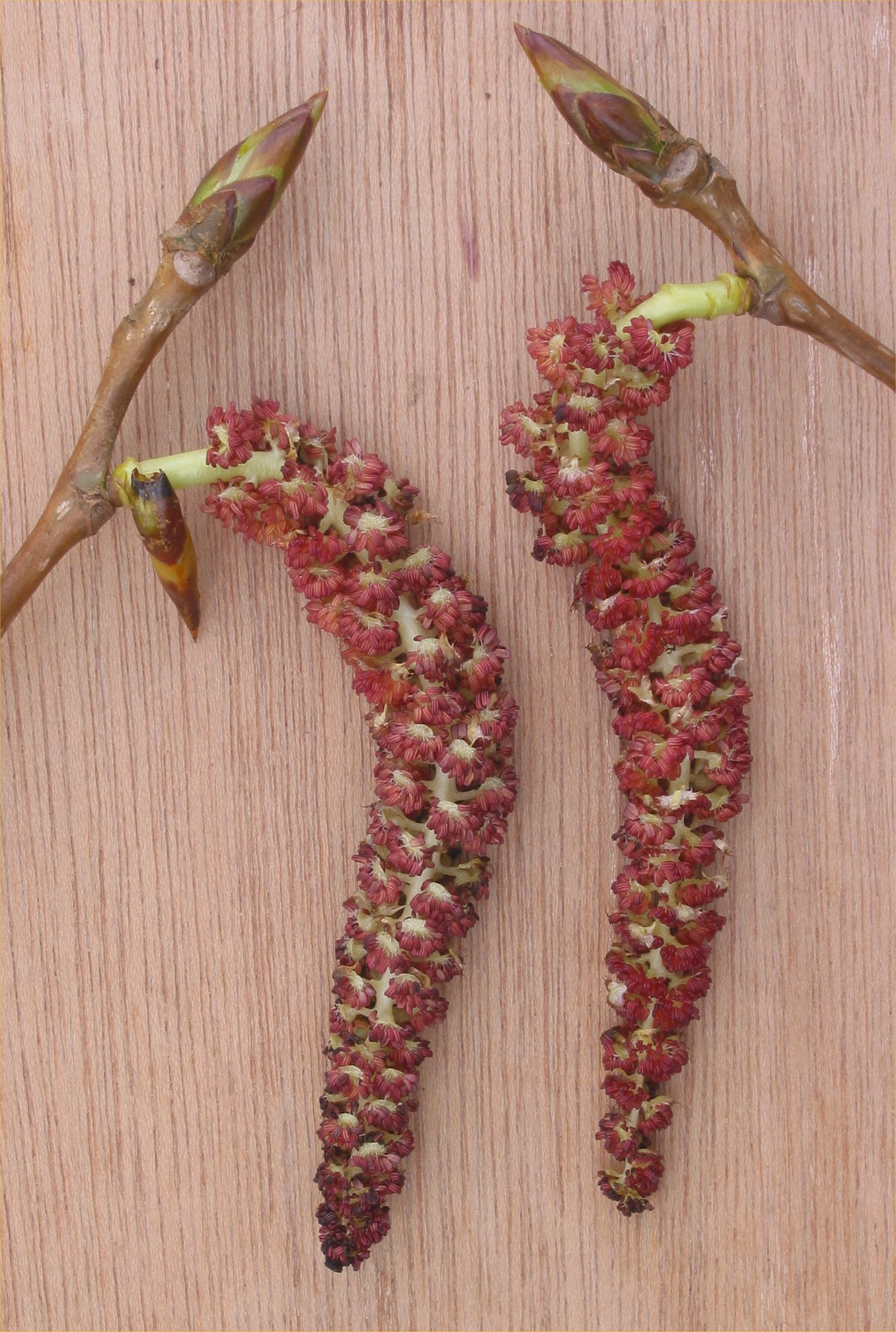
Male catkins of Populus × canadensis

The bark on young trees is smooth and white to greenish or dark grey, and often has conspicuous lenticels; on old trees, it remains smooth in some species, but becomes rough and deeply fissured in others. The shoots are stout, with (unlike in the related willows) the terminal bud present. The leaves are spirally arranged, and vary in shape from triangular to circular or (rarely) lobed, and with a long petiole; in species in the sections Populus and Aigeiros, the petioles are laterally flattened, so that breezes easily cause the leaves to wobble back and forth, giving the whole tree a "twinkling" appearance in a breeze. Leaf size is very variable even on a single tree, typically with small leaves on side shoots, and very large leaves on strong-growing lead shoots. The leaves often turn bright gold to yellow before they fall during autumn.

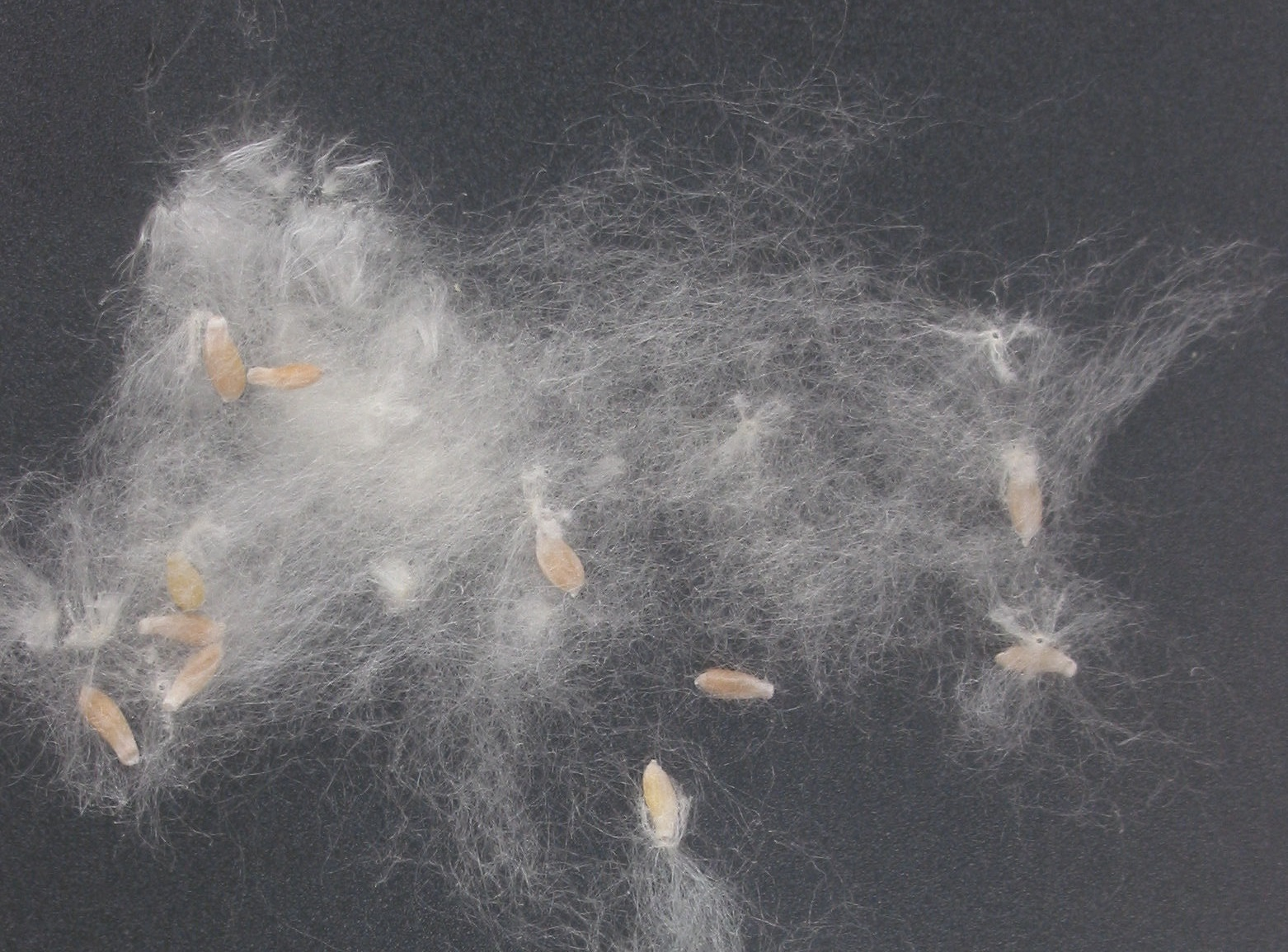
The seeds of the poplar tree are easily dispersed by the wind, due to the fine hairs surrounding them.

The flowers are mostly dioecious (rarely monoecious) and appear in early spring before the leaves. They are borne in long, drooping, sessile or pedunculate catkins produced from buds formed in the axils of the leaves from the previous year. The flowers are each seated in a cup-shaped disk which is borne on the base of a scale which is itself attached to the rachis of the catkin. The scales are obovate, lobed, and fringed, membranous, hairy or smooth, and usually caducous. The male flowers are without calyx or corolla, and comprise a group of four to 60 stamens inserted on a disk; filaments are short and pale yellow; anthers are oblong, purple or red, introrse, and two-celled; the cells open longitudinally. The female flower also has no calyx or corolla, and comprises a single-celled ovary seated in a cup-shaped disk. The style is short, with two to four stigmata, variously lobed, and numerous ovules. Pollination is by wind, with the female catkins lengthening considerably between pollination and maturity. The fruit is a two- to four-valved dehiscent capsule, green to reddish-brown, mature in midsummer, containing numerous minute, light-brown seeds surrounded by tufts of long, soft, white hairs aiding wind dispersal.

== Taxonomy ==
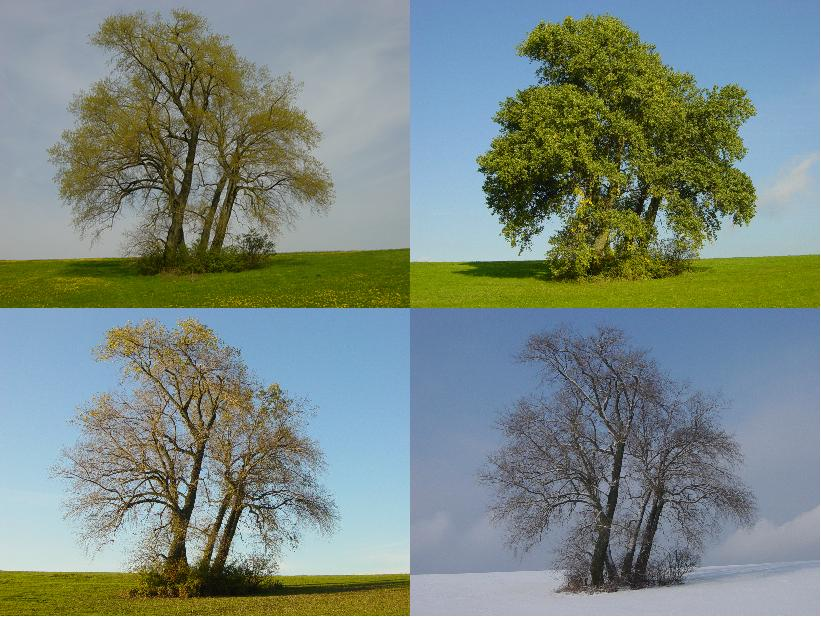
Black poplar Populus nigra on a hill through spring (top left), summer, autumn, and winter, in Germany

The genus Populus has traditionally been divided into six sections on the basis of leaf and flower characters; this classification is followed below. Recent genetic studies have largely supported this, confirming some previously suspected reticulate evolution due to past hybridisation and introgression events between the groups. Some species (noted below) had differing relationships indicated by their nuclear DNA and chloroplast DNA sequences (maternally inherited), a clear indication of likely hybrid origin. Hybridisation continues to be common in the genus, with several hybrids between species in different sections known. There are currently 61 accepted species in the genus.

=== Phylogeny ===
Some of the most easily identifiable fossils of this genus belongs to Populus wilmattae, which come from the Late Paleocene of North America about 58 million years ago. However, fossils from the Cretaceous of this genus have been found in Tibet and Heilongjiang, China.

=== Selected species ===
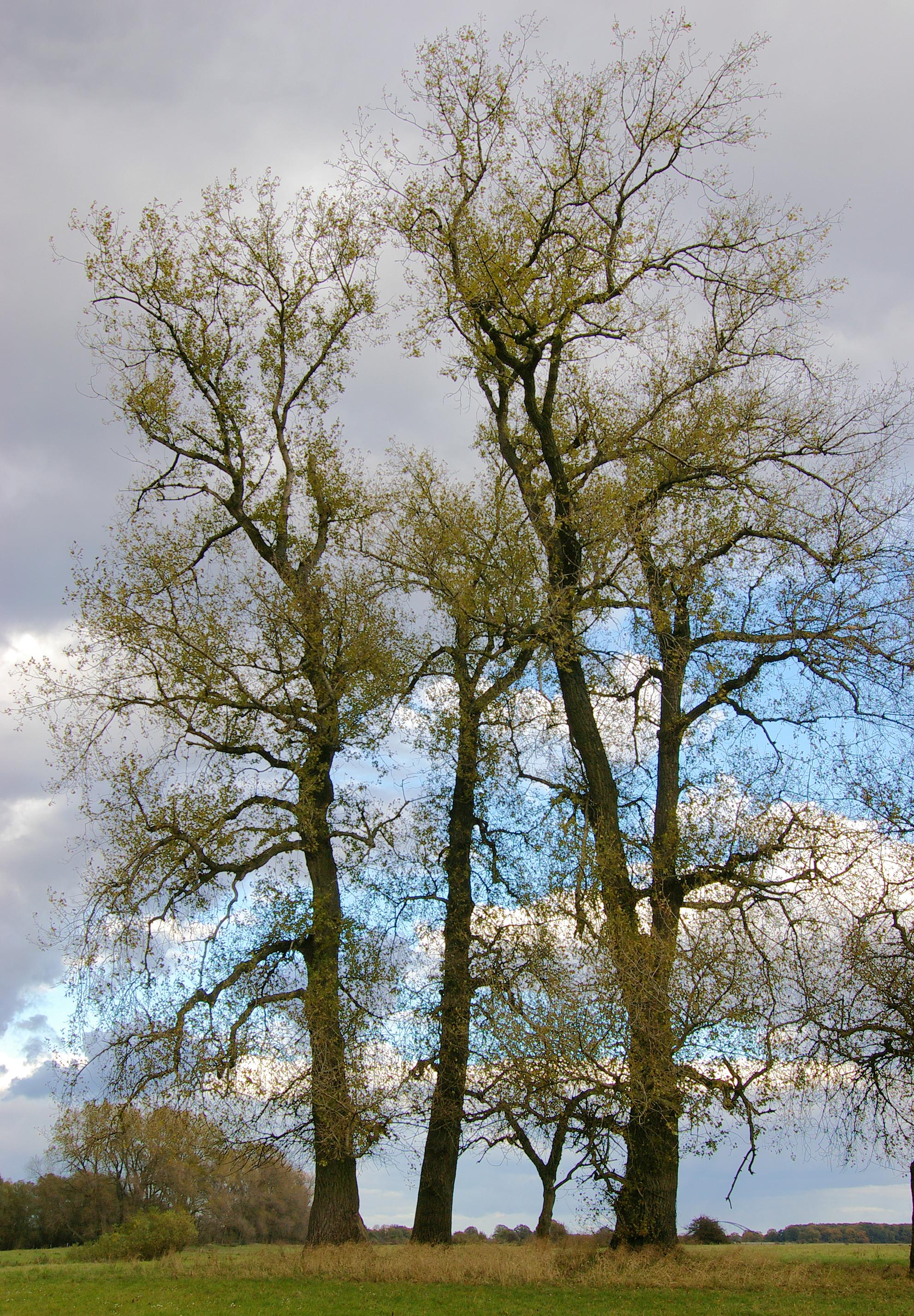
Populus nigra in autumn

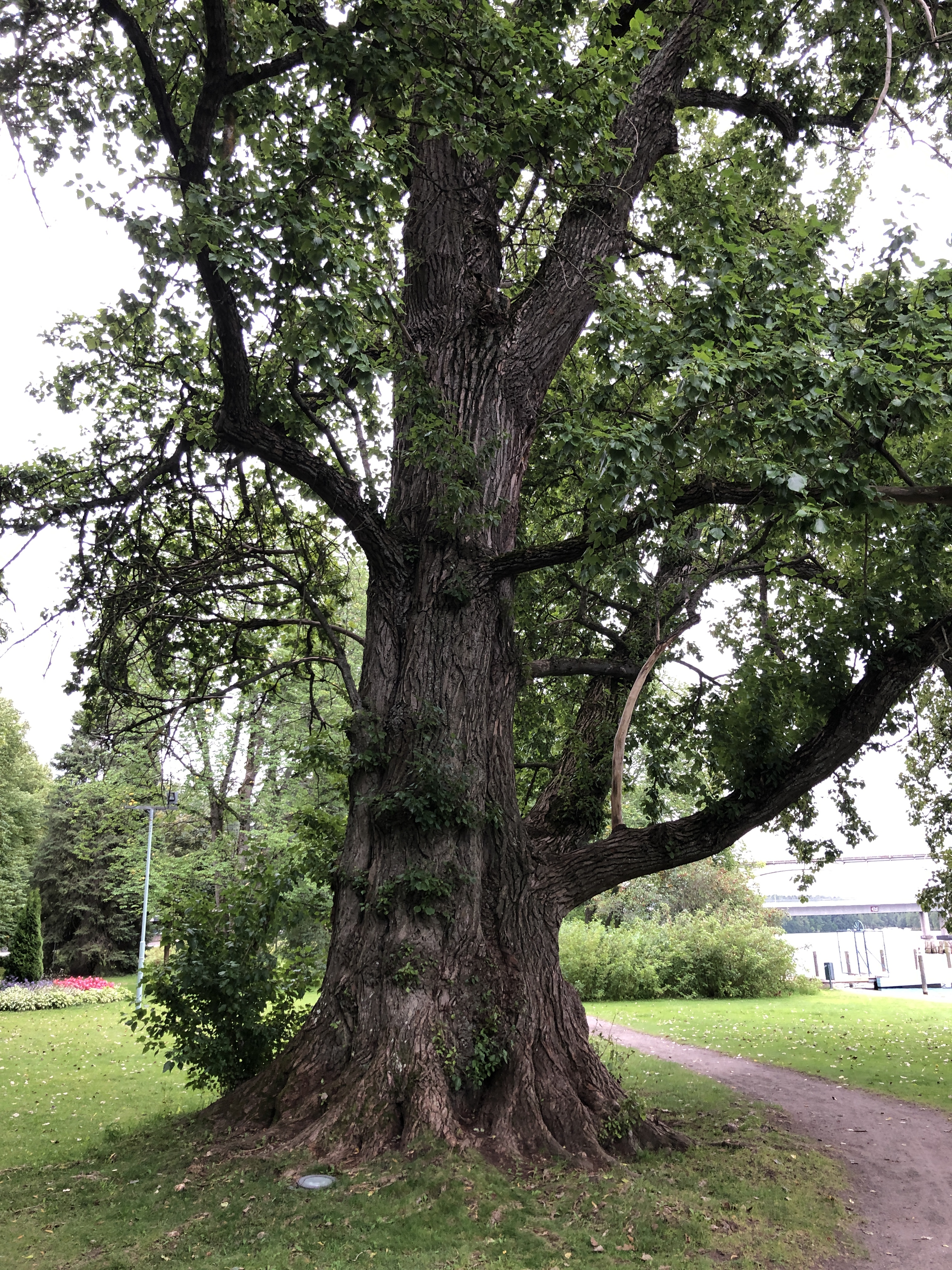
Populus × petrowskiana ("Czar's Poplar") in Heinola, Finland

- Populus section Populus – aspens and white poplar (circumpolar subarctic and cool temperate, and mountains farther south, white poplar warm temperate)
  - Populus adenopoda – Chinese aspen (eastern Asia)
  - Populus alba – white poplar (southern Europe to central Asia)
    - Populus × canescens (P. alba × P. tremula) – grey poplar
  - Populus brandegeei - Baja poplar (northwestern Mexico)
  - Populus davidiana – Korean aspen (eastern Asia)
  - Populus grandidentata – bigtooth aspen (eastern North America)
  - Populus luziarum – Jalisco, Mexico
  - Populus primaveralepensis – Jalisco, Mexico
  - Populus sieboldii – Japanese aspen (eastern Asia)
  - Populus tremula – aspen, common aspen, Eurasian aspen, European aspen, quaking aspen (Europe, northern Asia)
  - Populus tremuloides – quaking aspen or trembling aspen (North America)
- Populus section Aigeiros – black poplars, some of the cottonwoods (North America, Europe, western Asia; temperate)
  - Populus deltoides – eastern cottonwood (eastern North America)
  - Populus fremontii – Fremont cottonwood (western North America)
  - Populus nigra – black poplar (Europe), placed here by nuclear DNA; cpDNA places it in sect. Populus (including Populus afghanica)
    - Populus × canadensis (P. deltoides × P. nigra) – hybrid black poplar
    - Populus × inopina (P. nigra × P. fremontii) – hybrid black poplar

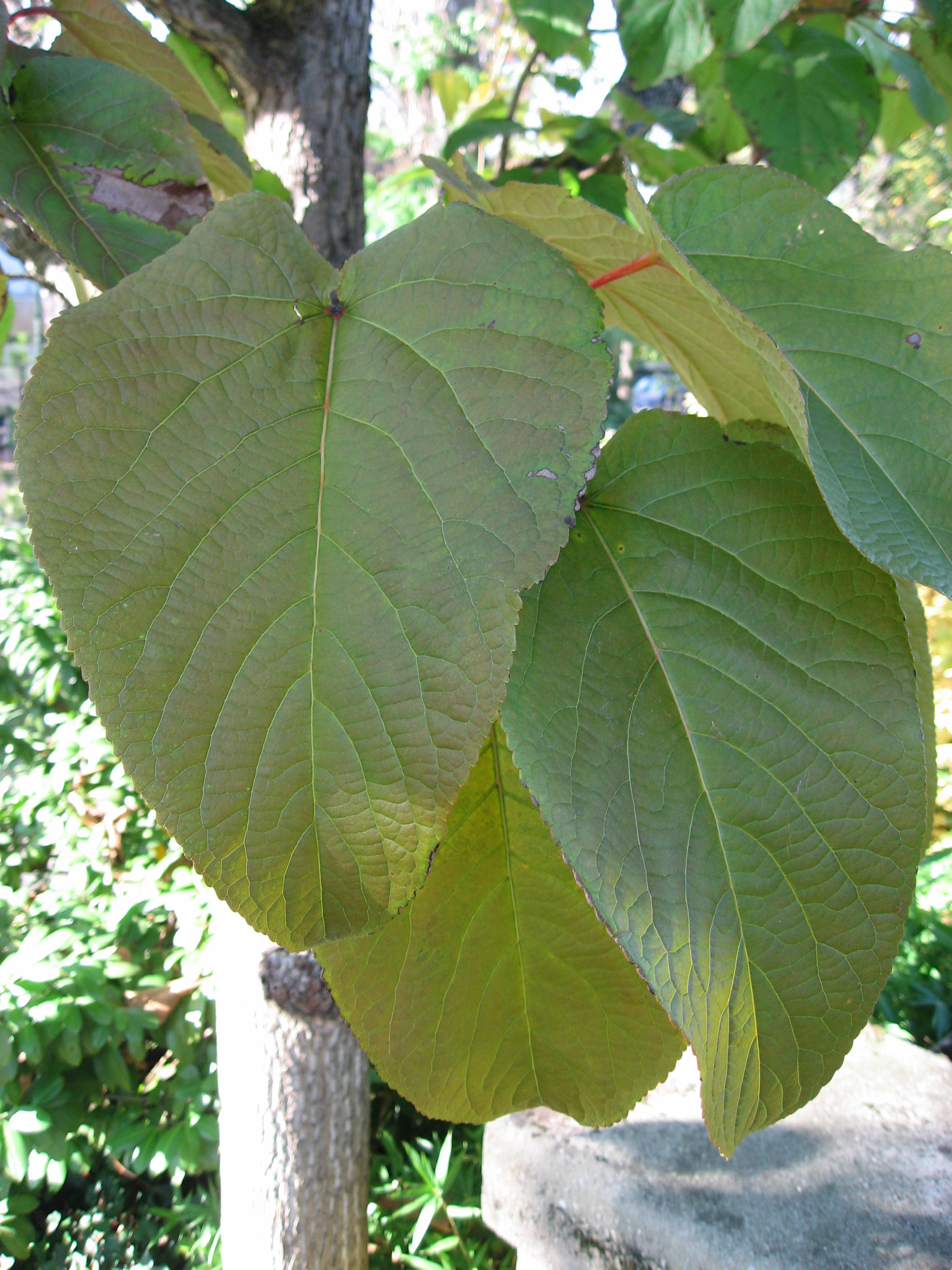
Leaves of Populus lasiocarpa

- Populus section Tacamahaca – balsam poplars (North America, Asia; cool temperate)
  - Populus angustifolia – willow-leaved poplar or narrowleaf cottonwood (central North America)
  - Populus balsamifera – Balsam poplar (northern North America) (= P. candicans, P. tacamahaca)
  - Populus cathayana – (northeast Asia)
  - Populus ciliata – (Asia)
  - Populus koreana J.Rehnder – Korean poplar (northeast Asia)
  - Populus laurifolia – laurel-leaf poplar (central Asia)
  - Populus maximowiczii A.Henry – Maximowicz' poplar, Korean poplar, Mongolian poplar, Japanese poplar (northeast Asia)
  - Populus simonii – Simon's poplar (northeast Asia)
  - Populus suaveolens Fischer – Korean poplar, Mongolian poplar, Japanese poplar (northeast Asia)
  - Populus szechuanica – Sichuan poplar (northeast Asia), placed here by nuclear DNA; cpDNA places it in sect. Aigeiros
  - Populus trichocarpa – western balsam poplar or black cottonwood (western North America)
  - Populus tristis (northeast Asia), placed here by nuclear DNA; cpDNA places it in sect. Aigeiros
  - Populus ussuriensis – Ussuri poplar (northeast Asia)
  - Populus yunnanensis – Yunnan poplar (east Asia)
- Populus section Leucoides – necklace poplars or bigleaf poplars (eastern North America, eastern Asia; warm temperate)
  - Populus heterophylla – downy poplar (southeastern North America)
  - Populus lasiocarpa – Chinese necklace poplar (eastern Asia)
  - Populus wilsonii – Wilson's poplar (eastern Asia)
- Populus section Turanga – subtropical poplars (southwest Asia, east Africa; subtropical to tropical)
  - Populus euphratica – Euphrates poplar (North Africa, southwest and central Asia)
  - Populus ilicifolia – Tana River poplar (East Africa)
- Populus section Abaso – Mexican poplars (Mexico; subtropical to tropical)
  - Populus guzmanantlensis (Mexico) (may be conspecific with Populus simaroa)
  - Populus mexicana – Mexico poplar (Mexico)
- Intersectional hybrids
  - Populus × acuminata (P. angustifolia × P. deltoides) – lanceleaf cottonwood
  - Populus Pacific albus (North America)
  - Populus × berolinensis (P. laurifolia × P. nigra f. italica) – Berlin poplar

== Ecology ==
Poplars of the cottonwood section are often wetlands or riparian trees. The aspens are among the most important boreal broadleaf trees.

Poplars and aspens are important food plants for the larvae of a large number of Lepidoptera species. Pleurotus populinus, the aspen oyster mushroom, is found exclusively on dead wood of Populus trees in North America.

Several species of Populus in the United Kingdom and other parts of Europe have experienced heavy dieback; this is thought in part to be due to Sesia apiformis which bores into the trunk of the tree during its larval stage.

== Cultivation ==
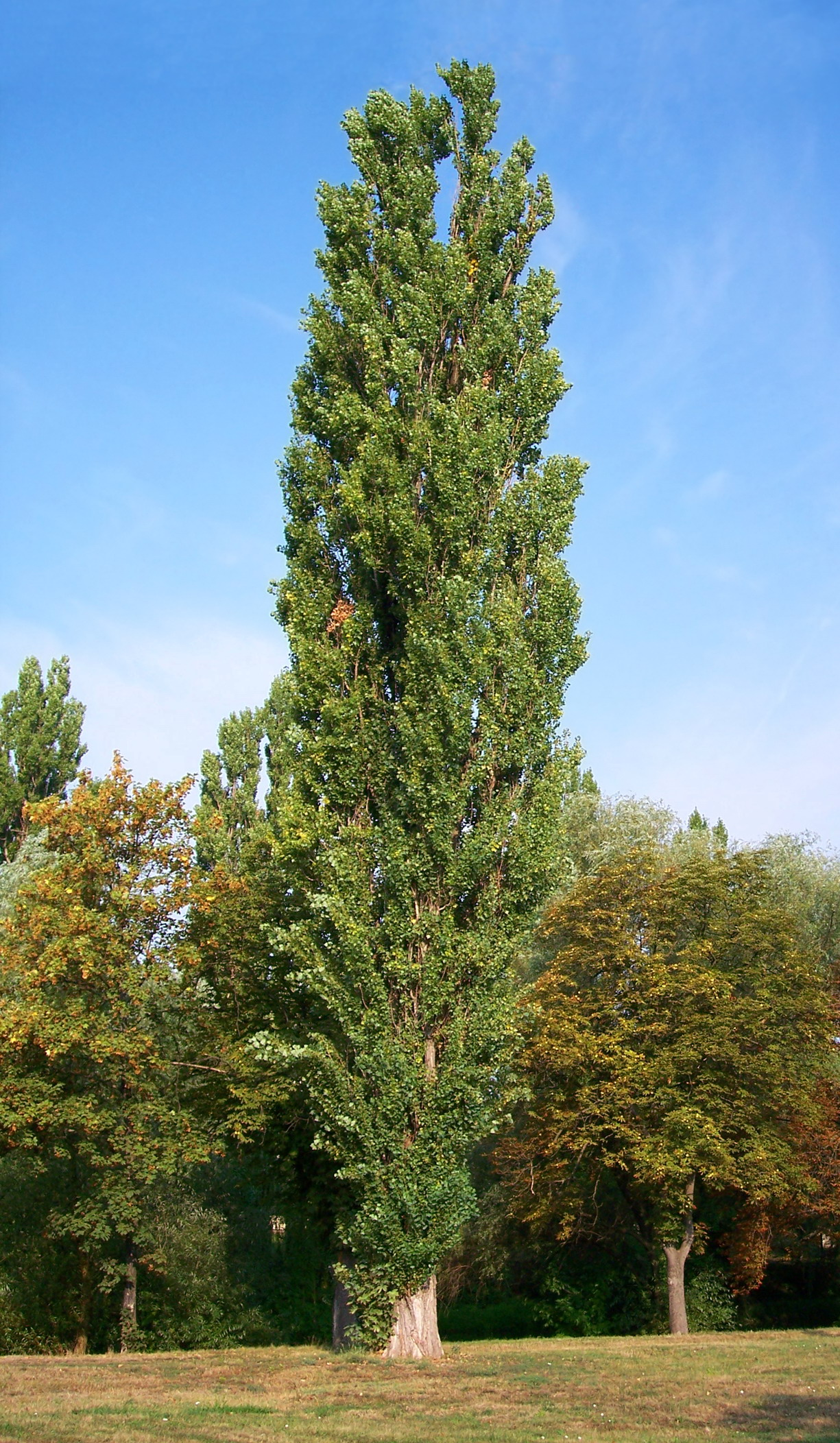
Fastigiate black poplar cultivar of the Plantierensis group, in Hungary

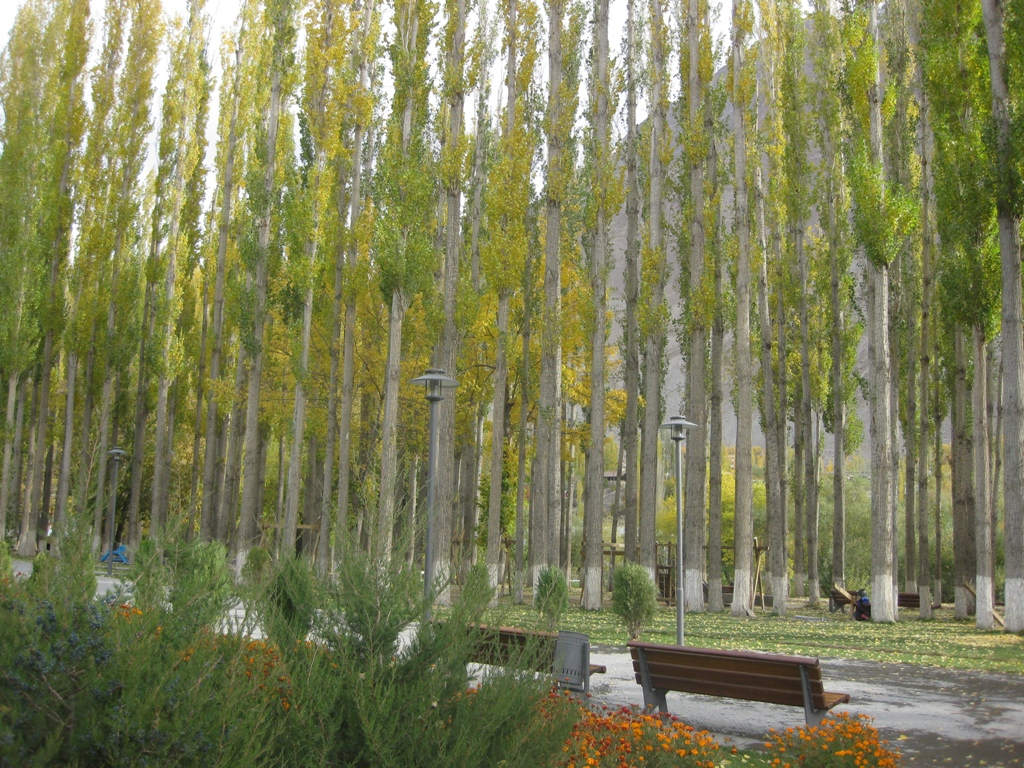
Poplars dominate the flora of Khorog City Park, Gorno-Badakhshan, Tajikistan

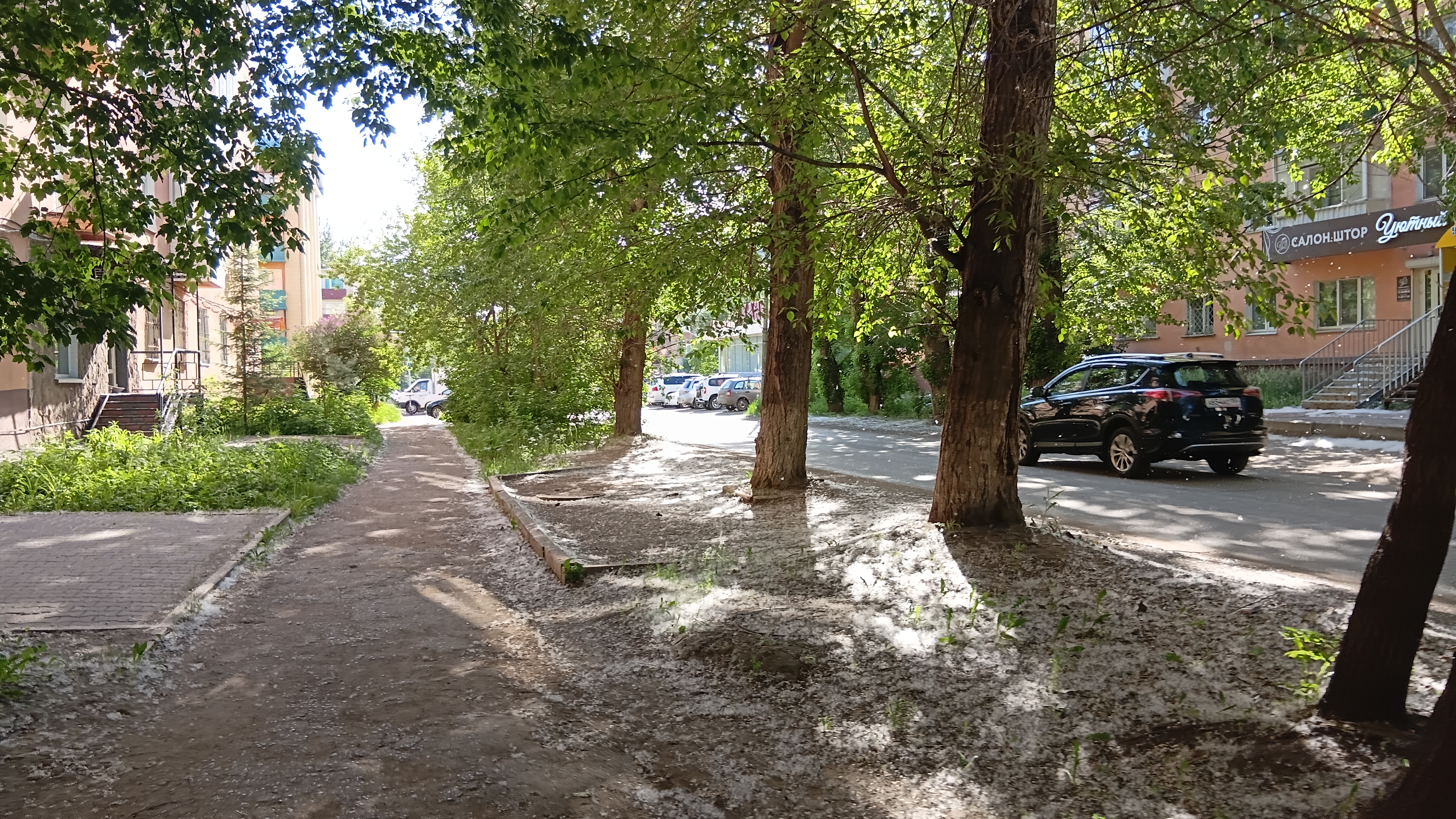
Poplars of Omsk city, Russia

Many poplars are grown as ornamental trees, with numerous cultivars used. They have the advantage of growing to a very large size at a rapid pace. Almost all poplars take root readily from cuttings or where broken branches lie on the ground (they also often have remarkable suckering abilities, and can form huge colonies from a single original tree, such as the famous Pando forest made of thousands of Populus tremuloides clones).

Trees with fastigiate (erect, columnar) branching are particularly popular, and are widely grown across Europe and southwest Asia. However, like willows, poplars have very vigorous and invasive root systems stretching up to 40 metres (130 ft) from the trees; planting close to houses or ceramic water pipes may result in damaged foundations and cracked walls and pipes due to their search for moisture.

A simple, reproducible, high-frequency micropropagation protocol in eastern cottonwood Populus deltoides has been reported by Yadav et al. 2009.

=== India ===
Popular Populus variety G48 in Punjab, India

In India, the poplar is grown commercially by farmers, mainly in the Punjab region. Common poplar varieties are:

- G48 (grown in the plains of Punjab, Haryana, UP)
- w22 (grown in mountainous regions, e.g., Himachal Pradesh, Pathankot, Jammu)

The trees are grown from kalam or cuttings, harvested annually in January and February, and commercially available up to 15 November.

Poplars are most commonly used to make plywood: Yamuna Nagar in Haryana state has a large plywood industry reliant upon poplar. It is graded according to sizes known as "over" (over 24 inches (610 mm)), "under" (18–24 inches (460–610 mm)), and "sokta" (less than 18 inches (460 mm)).

=== Pakistan ===
In Pakistan, poplar is grown on a commercial level by farmers in Punjab, Sindh, and Khyber Pakhtunkhwa Provinces. However, all varieties are seriously susceptible to termite attack, causing significant losses to poplar every year. Logs of poplar are therefore also used as bait in termite traps for biocontrol of termites in crops.

== Uses ==
Traditional Pamiris house

Although the wood from Populus is known as poplar wood, a common high-quality hardwood "poplar" with a greenish colour is actually from an unrelated genus Liriodendron. Populus wood is a lighter, more porous material.

Its flexibility and close grain make it suitable for a number of applications, similar to those of willow. The Greeks and Etruscans made shields of poplar, and Pliny the Elder also recommended poplar for this purpose. Poplar continued to be used for shield construction through the Middle Ages and was renowned for a durability similar to that of oak, but with a substantial reduction in weight.

=== Food ===
In addition to the foliage and other parts of Populus species being consumed by animals, the starchy sap layer (underneath the outer bark) is edible to humans, both raw and cooked.

=== Manufacturing ===
- Guitar production, mainly used with cheaper import guitars
- In many areas, fast-growing hybrid poplars are grown on plantations for pulpwood
- Poplar is widely used for the manufacture of paper.
- It is also sold as inexpensive hardwood timber, used for pallets and cheap plywood; more specialised uses including matches and matchboxes and the boxes for Camembert cheese.
- Poplar wood is also widely used in the snowboard industry for the snowboard core, because it has exceptional flexibility, and is sometimes used in the bodies of electric guitars and drums.
- Poplar wood, particularly when seasoned, makes a good hearth for a bow drill.
- Because of its high tannic acid content, the bark has been used in Europe for tanning leather.
- Poplar wood can be used to produce chopsticks or wooden shoes.
- Baking moulds from peeled poplar may be used in the freezer, oven, or microwave oven.

=== Energy ===
Interest exists in using poplar as an energy crop for biomass, in energy forestry systems, particularly in light of its high energy-in to energy-out ratio, large carbon mitigation potential, and fast growth.

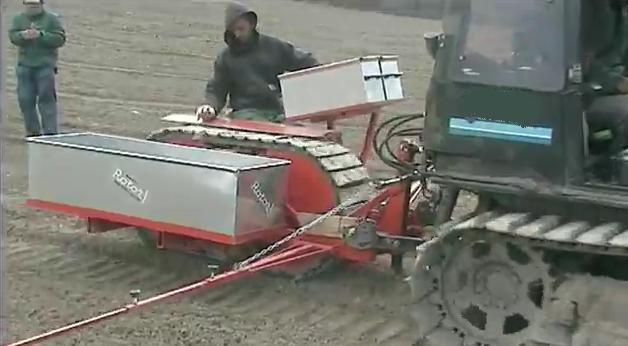
Rotor poplar and willow cuttings planter, planting a new nursery of poplar for biomass with short rotation

In the United Kingdom, poplar (as with fellow energy crop willow) is typically grown in a short rotation coppice system for two to five years (with single or multiple stems), then harvested and burned - the yield of some varieties can be as high as 12 oven-dry tonnes per hectare every year. In warmer regions like Italy this crop can produce up to 13.8, 16.4 oven-dry tonnes of biomass per hectare every year for biannual and triennial cutting cycles also showing a positive energy balance and a high energy efficiency.

In Sweden and other parts of Europe, poplar plantations on agricultural land have demonstrated considerable potential for supplying biomass for energy, with studies showing high yields and positive energy balances. Research indicates that these plantations can be managed sustainably with appropriate practices. For instance, nitrogen fertilization has been shown to increase biomass yields, although its effects on nutrient leaching and environmental quality require careful management. Studies also highlight the importance of considering water and soil quality when establishing Populus plantations, as well-managed systems can have neutral or even positive impacts on groundwater and soil organic carbon.

Furthermore, poplar and willow plantations can provide ecosystem services beyond bioenergy, such as improving water quality and contributing to phytotechnologies for environmental remediation. Overall, the cultivation of Populus for energy use is viewed as a promising and sustainable approach in temperate regions, provided that best management practices are followed.

=== Fuel ===
Biofuel is another option for using poplar as bioenergy supply. In the United States, scientists studied converting short rotation coppice poplar into sugars for biofuel (e.g. ethanol) production. Considering the relative cheap price, the process of making biofuel from SRC can be economically feasible, although the conversion yield from short rotation coppice (as juvenile crops) were lower than regular mature wood. Besides biochemical conversion, thermochemical conversion (e.g. fast pyrolysis) was also studied for making biofuel from short rotation coppice poplar and was found to have higher energy recovery than that from bioconversion.

=== Art ===
Poplar was the most common wood used in Italy for panel paintings; the Mona Lisa and most famous early Italian Renaissance paintings are on poplar. The wood is generally white, often with a slightly yellowish colour.

Some stringed instruments are made with one-piece poplar backs; violas made in this fashion are said to have a particularly resonant tone. Similarly, though typically it is considered to have a less attractive grain than the traditional sitka spruce, poplar is beginning to be targeted by some harp luthiers as a sustainable and even superior alternative for their sound boards: in these cases another hardwood veneer is sometimes applied to the resonant poplar base both for cosmetic reasons, and supposedly to fine-tune the acoustic properties.

=== Land management ===
Lombardy poplars are frequently used as a windbreak around agricultural fields to protect against wind erosion.

=== Agriculture ===
Logs from the poplar provide a growing medium for shiitake mushrooms.

=== Phytoremediation ===
Poplar represents a suitable candidate for phytoremediation since it has the ability to remove and store harmful pollutants in its trunk while also removing air pollution. This plant has been successfully used to target many types of pollutants including trace element (TEs) in soil and sewage sludge, Polychlorinated Biphenyl (PCBs), Trichloroethylene (TCE), Polycyclic Aromatic Hydrocarbon (PAHs).

== Culture ==
Two notable poems in English lament the cutting down of poplars, William Cowper's "The Poplar Field" and Gerard Manley Hopkins' "Binsey Poplars felled 1879".

The Alamo in San Antonio, comes from the Spanish word for poplar trees, since many surrounded the site (probably Populus deltoides).

Los Alamos, New Mexico (where the Manhattan project was conducted) is also named from the Spanish word for poplar trees.

In Billie Holiday's "Strange Fruit", she sings "Black bodies swinging in the southern breeze/Strange fruit hanging from the poplar trees…".

The Odd Poplars Alley, in Iași, Romania, is one of the spots where Mihai Eminescu sought inspiration in his works (the poem "Down Where the Lonely Poplars Grow"). In 1973, the 15 white poplars still left (with age ranges between 233 and 371 years) were declared natural monuments.

In Ukraine, one of neighborhoods of Kyiv is named after Populus nigra as Osokorky, a local name.

In Greek mythology, the Heliades were turned into poplar trees by the gods when their brother, Phaethon, died after attempting to drive his father Helios's chariot across the sky.
