= Energy crop =

Crops grown solely to burn for energy

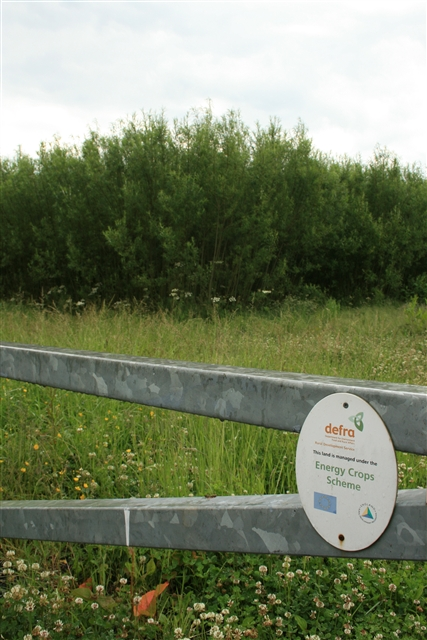
A Department for Environment, Food and Rural Affairs energy crops scheme plantation in the United Kingdom. Energy crops of this sort can be used in conventional power stations or specialised electricity generation units, reducing the amount of fossil fuel-derived carbon dioxide emissions.

Energy crops are low-cost and low-maintenance crops grown solely for renewable bioenergy production (not for food). The crops are processed into solid, liquid or gaseous fuels, such as pellets, bioethanol or biogas. The fuels are burned to generate electrical power or heat.

The plants are generally categorized as woody or herbaceous. Woody plants include willow and poplar, herbaceous plants include Miscanthus x giganteus and Pennisetum purpureum (both known as elephant grass). Herbaceous crops, while physically smaller than trees, store roughly twice the amount of CO_{2} (in the form of carbon) below ground compared to woody crops.

Through biotechnological procedures such as genetic modification, plants can be manipulated to create higher yields. Relatively high yields can also be realized with existing cultivars. However, some additional advantages such as reduced associated costs (i.e. costs during the manufacturing process) and less water use can only be accomplished by using genetically modified crops.

== Types ==
=== Solid biomass ===
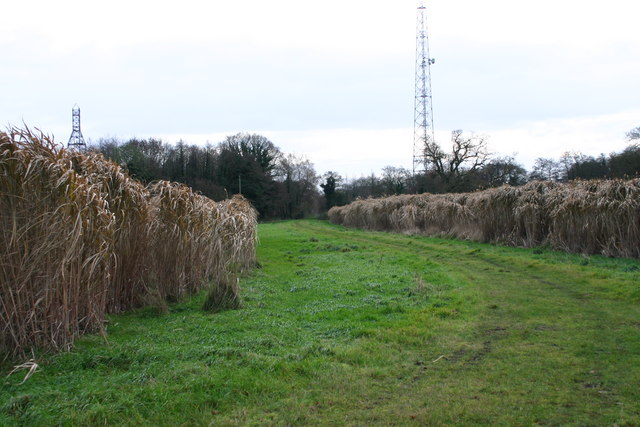
Elephant grass (Miscanthus giganteus) is an experimental energy crop.

Solid biomass, often pelletized, is used for combustion in thermal power stations, either alone or co-fired with other fuels. Alternatively it may be used for heat or combined heat and power (CHP) production.

In short rotation coppice (SRC) agriculture, fast growing tree species like willow and poplar are grown and harvested in short cycles of three to five years. These trees grow best in wet soil conditions. An influence on local water conditions can not be excluded. Establishment close to vulnerable wetland should be avoided.

=== Gas biomass (methane) ===
Whole crops such as maize, Sudan grass, millet, white sweet clover, and many others can be made into silage and then converted into biogas. Anaerobic digesters or biogas plants can be directly supplemented with energy crops once they have been ensiled into silage. The fastest-growing sector of German biofarming has been in the area of "Renewable Energy Crops" on nearly 500,000 ha (1,200,000 acres) of land (2006). Energy crops can also be grown to boost gas yields where feedstocks have a low energy content, such as manures and spoiled grain. It is estimated that the energy yield presently of bioenergy crops converted via silage to methane is about 2 GWh/km^{2} (1.8×10^{10} BTU/sq mi) annually. Small mixed cropping enterprises with animals can use a portion of their acreage to grow and convert energy crops and sustain the entire farm's energy requirements with about one-fifth of the acreage. In Europe and especially Germany, however, this rapid growth has occurred only with substantial government support, as in the German bonus system for renewable energy. Similar developments of integrating crop farming and bioenergy production via silage-methane have been almost entirely overlooked in North America, where political and structural issues and a huge continued push to centralize energy production has overshadowed positive developments.

=== Liquid biomass ===
==== Biodiesel ====
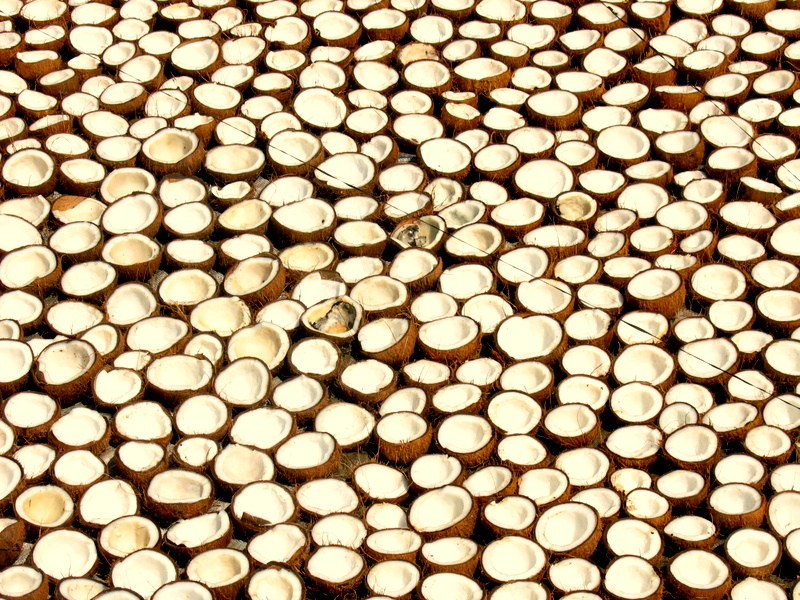
Coconuts sun-dried in Kozhikode, Kerala, for making copra, the dried meat, or kernel, of the coconut. Coconut oil extracted from it has made copra an important agricultural commodity for many coconut-producing countries. It also yields coconut cake which is mainly used as feed for livestock.

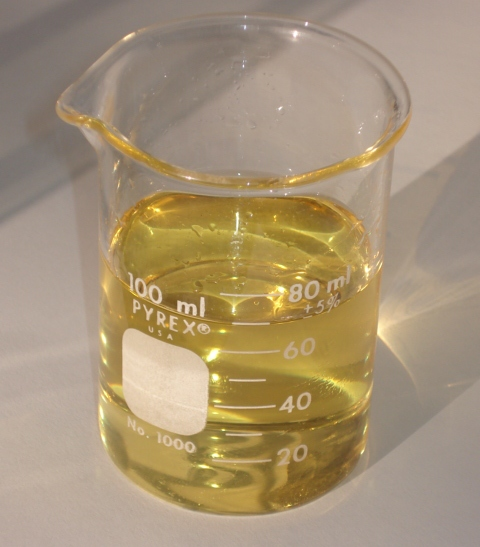
Pure biodiesel (B-100), made from soybeans

European production of biodiesel from energy crops has grown steadily in the last decade, principally focused on rapeseed used for oil and energy. Production of oil/biodiesel from rape covers more than 12,000 km^{2} in Germany alone, and has doubled in the past 15 years. Typical yield of oil as pure biodiesel is 100,000 L/km^{2} (68,000 US gal/sq mi; 57,000 imp gal/sq mi) or higher, making biodiesel crops economically attractive, provided sustainable crop rotations are used that are nutrient-balanced and prevent the spread of disease such as clubroot. Biodiesel yield of soybeans is significantly lower than that of rape.

Typical oil extractable by weight
Crop	Oil %
copra	62
castor seed	50
sesame	50
groundnut kernel	42
jatropha	40
rapeseed	37
palm kernel	36
mustard seed	35
sunflower	32
palm fruit	20
soybean	14
cotton seed	13

==== Bioethanol ====
Two leading non-food crops for the production of cellulosic bioethanol are switchgrass and giant miscanthus. There has been a preoccupation with cellulosic bioethanol in America as the agricultural structure supporting biomethane is absent in many regions, with no credits or bonus system in place. Grasses are also energy crops for biobutanol.

Bioethanol also refers to the technology of using principally corn (maize seed) to make ethanol directly through fermentation. However, under certain field and process conditions this process can consume as much energy as is the energy value of the ethanol it produces, therefore being non-sustainable. New developments in converting grain stillage (referred to as distillers grain stillage or DGS) into biogas looks promising as a means to improve the poor energy ratio of this type of bioethanol process.

== Energy crop use in various countries ==
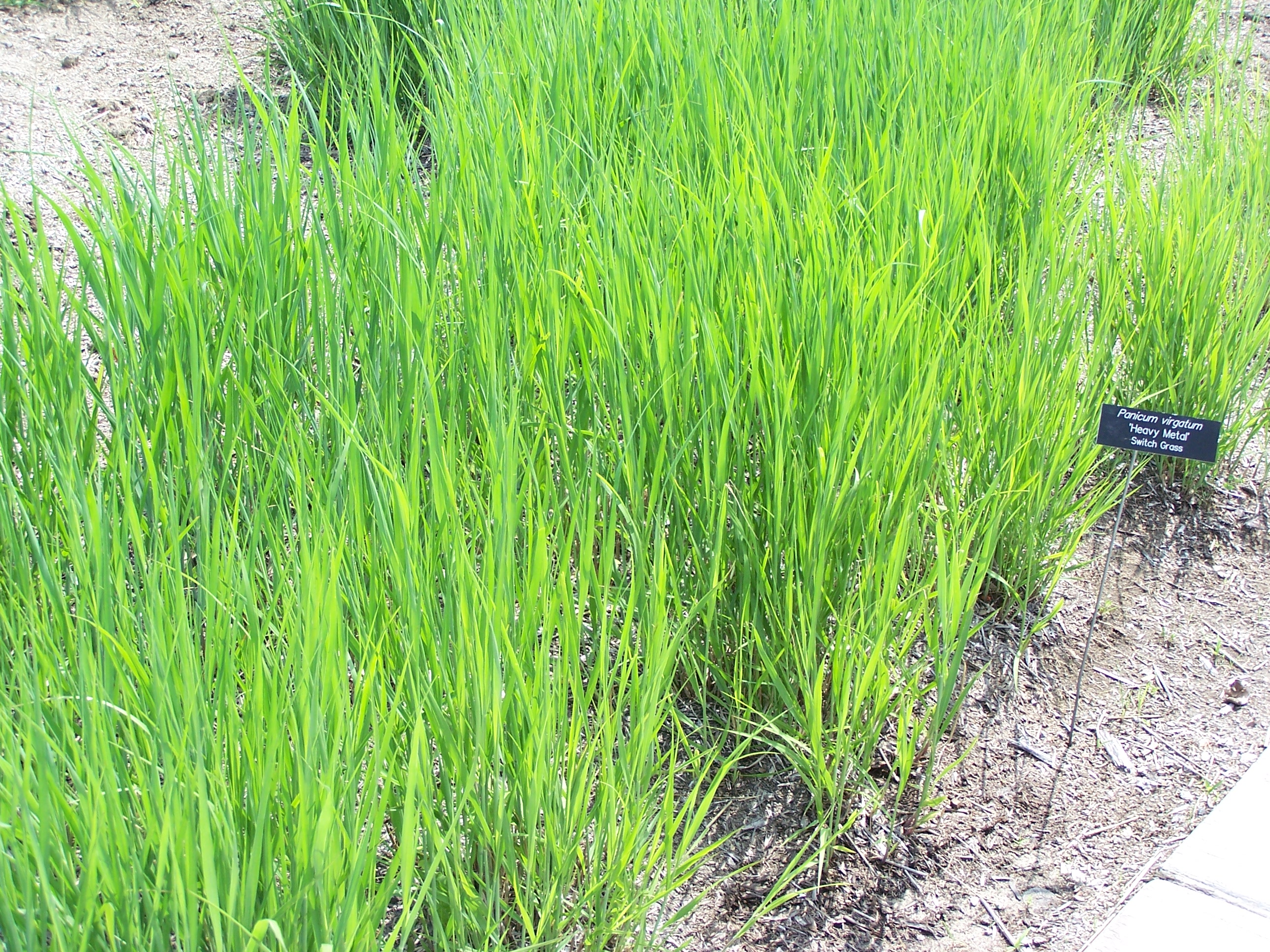
Panicum virgatum switchgrass, valuable in biofuel production, soil conservation and carbon sequestration in soils.

In Sweden, willow and hemp are often used.

In Finland, reed canary grass is a popular energy crop.

Switchgrass (panicum virgatum) is another energy crop. It requires from 0.97 to 1.34 GJ fossil energy to produce 1 tonne of switchgrass, compared with 1.99 to 2.66 GJ to produce 1 tonne of corn. Given that switchgrass contains approximately 18.8 GJ/ODT of biomass, the energy output-to-input ratio for the crop can be up to 20:1.

== Energy crop use in thermal power stations ==
Several methods exist to reduce pollution and reduce or eliminate carbon emissions of fossil fuel power plants. A frequently used and cost-efficient method is to convert a plant to run on a different fuel (such as energy crops/biomass). In some instances, torrefaction of biomass may benefit the power plant if energy crops/biomass is the material the converted fossil fuel power plant will be using. Also, when using energy crops as the fuel, and if implementing biochar production, the thermal power plant can even become carbon negative rather than just carbon neutral. Improving the energy efficiency of a coal-fired power plant can also reduce emissions.

== Sustainability aspects ==
In recent years, biofuels have become more attractive to many countries as possible replacements for fossil fuels. Therefore, understanding the sustainability of this renewable resource is very important. There are many benefits associated with the use of biofuels such as reduced greenhouse gas emissions, lower cost than fossil fuels, renewability, etc. These energy crops can be used to generate electricity. Wood cellulose and biofuel in conjunction with stationary electricity generation has been shown to be very efficient. From 2008 to 2013, there has been a 109% increase in global biofuel production and this is expected to increase an additional 60% to meet our demands (according to the Organization for Economic Co-operation and Development (OECD)/Food and Agriculture Organization (FAO)).

The projected increase in use/need of energy crops prompts the question of whether this resource is sustainable. Increased biofuel production draws on issues relating to changes in land use, impacts on ecosystem (soil and water resources), and adds to competition of land space for use to grow energy crops, food, or feed crops. Plants best suited for future bioenergy feedstocks should be fast growing, high yielding, and require very little energy inputs for growth and harvest etc. The use of energy crops for energy production can be beneficial because of its carbon neutrality. It represents a cheaper alternative to fossil fuels while being extremely diverse in the species of plants that can be used for energy production. But issues regarding cost (more expensive than other renewable energy sources), efficiency and space required to maintain production need to be considered and improved upon to allow for the use of biofuels to be commonly adopted.

=== Carbon neutrality ===
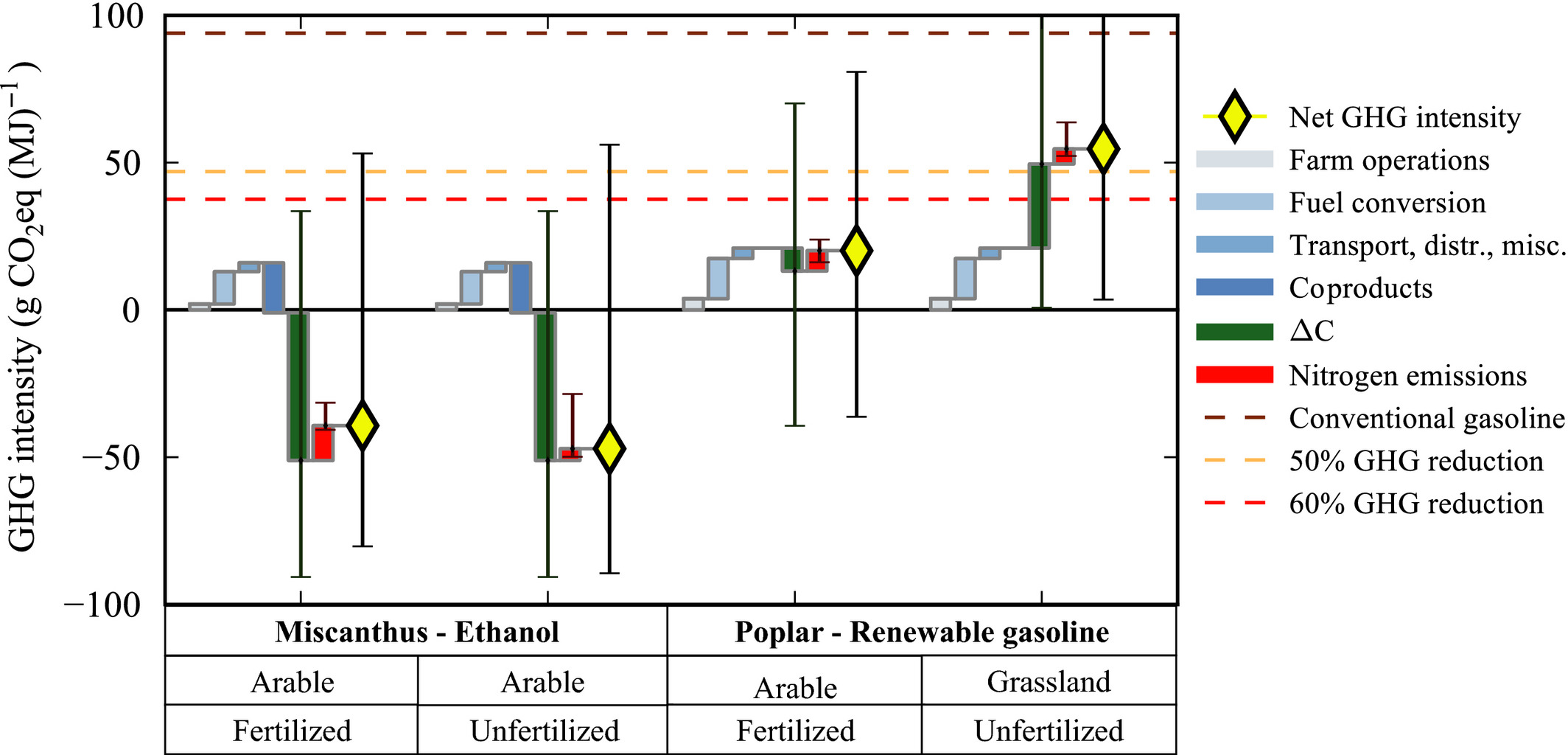
GHG / CO_{2} / carbon negativity for Miscanthus x giganteus production pathways

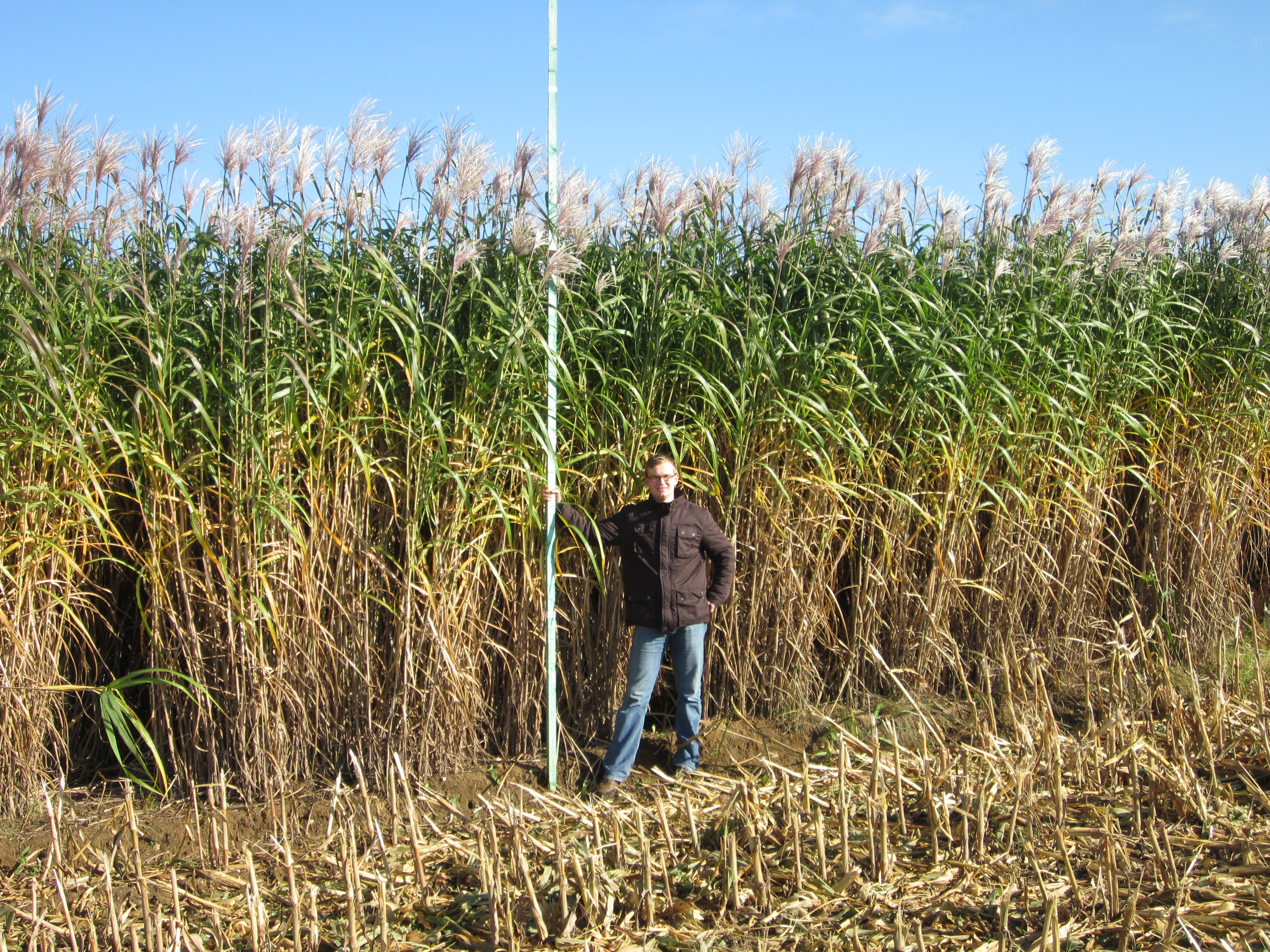
Miscanthus x giganteus energy crop, Germany.

During plant growth, CO_{2} is absorbed by the plants. While regular forest stands have carbon rotation times spanning many decades, short rotation forestry (SRF) stands have a rotation time of 8–20 years, and short rotation coppicing (SRC) stands 2–4 years. Perennial grasses like miscanthus or napier grass have a rotation time of 4–12 months. In addition to absorbing CO_{2} in its above-ground tissue, biomass crops also sequester carbon below ground, in roots and soil. Typically, perennial crops sequester more carbon than annual crops because the root buildup is allowed to continue undisturbed over many years. Also, perennial crops avoid the yearly tillage procedures (plowing, digging) associated with growing annual crops. Tilling helps the soil microbe populations to decompose the available carbon, producing CO_{2}.

Soil organic carbon has been observed to be greater below switchgrass crops than under cultivated cropland, especially at depths below 30 cm (12 in).

The amount of carbon sequestrated and the amount of greenhouse gases (GHGs) emitted will determine if the total GHG life cycle cost of a bioenergy project is positive, neutral, or negative. Specifically, a GHG/carbon-negative life cycle is possible if the total below-ground carbon accumulation more than compensates for the above-ground total life-cycle GHG emissions.

For example, for Miscanthus × giganteus, carbon neutrality and even negativity is within reach. This means that the yield and related carbon sequestration is so great that it accounts for more than the total of farm operations emissions, fuel conversion emissions, and transport emissions. Successful sequestration is dependent on planting sites, as the best soils for sequestration are those that are currently deficient in carbon.

For the UK, successful sequestration is expected for arable land over most of England and Wales, with unsuccessful sequestration expected in parts of Scotland, due to already carbon-rich soils (existing woodland). Also, for Scotland, the relatively lower yields in this colder climate make CO_{2} negativity harder to achieve. Soils already rich in carbon includes peatland and mature forest. Grassland can also be carbon-rich, and it has been found that the most successful carbon sequestration in the UK takes place below improved grasslands.

== See also ==
- Algal fuel
- Anaerobic digestion
- Cellulosic ethanol
- Coal pollution mitigation
- Eichhornia crassipes#Bioenergy
- European Biomass Association
- Myriophyllum
- Short rotation coppice
- Short rotation forestry
- Sustainable energy
- Table of biofuel crop yields
- Vegoil
