= ABANTIA =

Spanish electrical company

- Industry: Engineering, planning, development and the execution of complex systems.
- Predecessor: Aplicaciones Generales Eléctricas (AGE)
- Founded: 2006 (1944 AGE)
- Headquarters: Barcelona, Spain
- Website: www.abantia.com

ABANTIA is a Spanish group specialising in the engineering, planning, development and the execution of complex systems. The group was formed in July 2006 by renaming AGE (Applicaciones Generales Eléctricas), a company formed in 1944 as specialising in electrical and refrigeration installations, and all the subsidiaries companies created as AGE expanded in new activities. In 2009, Abantia has started activities in Italy, Poland, Guatemala, France and Abu Dhabi, and in 2011, in Mexico and Guatemala, El Salvador, Peru, Chile, Qatar. In 2013, Abantia made a bid for phase one of Kuwait’s Shagaya Multi-Technology Renewable Energy Park.
