= Cottonwood =

Cottonwood or cotton wood may refer to:

== Plants ==
- Celtis conferta subsp. amblyphylla, a tree in the hemp and hackberry family
- Hibiscus tiliaceus, a flowering shrub or tree in the mallow family
- In the genus Populus, a number of difficult-to-distinguish trees:
  - Populus angustifolia (narrowleaf cottonwood), in the Great Basin
  - Populus balsamifera (balsam cottonwood), in Canada and parts of northern United States
  - Populus heterophylla (swamp cottonwood), in the eastern United States
  - Populus trichocarpa (black cottonwood), in the Pacific Northwest of North America
  - Populus x jackii (balm-of-Gilead)
  - Populus × acuminata, lanceleaf cottonwood,
  - Populus sect. Aigeiros, a section of three species
    - Populus deltoides (eastern cottonwood), in eastern, central, and southwestern United States, and parts of Canada and Mexico
    - Populus fremontii (Fremont cottonwood), in the southwestern United States and Mexico
    - Populus nigra (black poplar), in Europe, Asia, and Africa

== Places ==
=== United States ===
- Cottonwood, Alabama, a town
- Cottonwood, Arizona, a city
- Cottonwood, California, a census-designated place in Shasta County
- Cottonwood, Yolo County, California, a ghost town
- Cottonwood, Colorado, a neighborhood in the town of Parker
- Cottonwood, Georgia, an unincorporated community in the City of Fayetteville
- Cottonwood, Idaho, a city
- Cottonwood Falls, Kansas, a city
- Cottonwood, Minnesota, a city
- Alamogordo, New Mexico, a city named for the great number of very large cottonwood trees in the area; the name means "fat cottonwood" in Spanish
- Cottonwood, Coal County, Oklahoma, an unincorporated community
- Cottonwood, Sequoyah County, Oklahoma, an unincorporated community
- Cottonwood, South Dakota, a town
- Alamo, Texas, a city named for the Alamo Mission; the name means "cottonwood" in Spanish
- Cottonwood, Callahan County, Texas, an unincorporated community
- Cottonwood, Kaufman County, Texas, a city
- Cottonwood West, Utah, an unincorporated area in Salt Lake County that has since become part of the cities of Holladay and Murray
- Cottonwood Heights, Utah, a city south of Cottonwood West

== Canada ==
- Cottonwoods, Manitoba, an unincorporated community

== People ==
- Eli Cottonwood, ring name of the professional wrestler Kipp Christianson, formerly from WWE's NXT
- Joe Cottonwood (born 1947), American author of fiction and poetry

== Other uses ==
- Cottonwood Limestone, a geologic member of limestone in Nebraska, Kansas, and Oklahoma
- Cottonwood (EP), a 2019 EP by NLE Choppa
- "Cottonwood", a 2025 song by Twenty One Pilots from Breach

== See also ==
- Cottonwood Island (disambiguation)
- Cottonwood Lake (disambiguation)
- Cottonwood River (disambiguation)
- Cottonwood Township (disambiguation)
- Cotton tree (disambiguation)
- Alamo (disambiguation); cottonwood in Spanish is álamo
