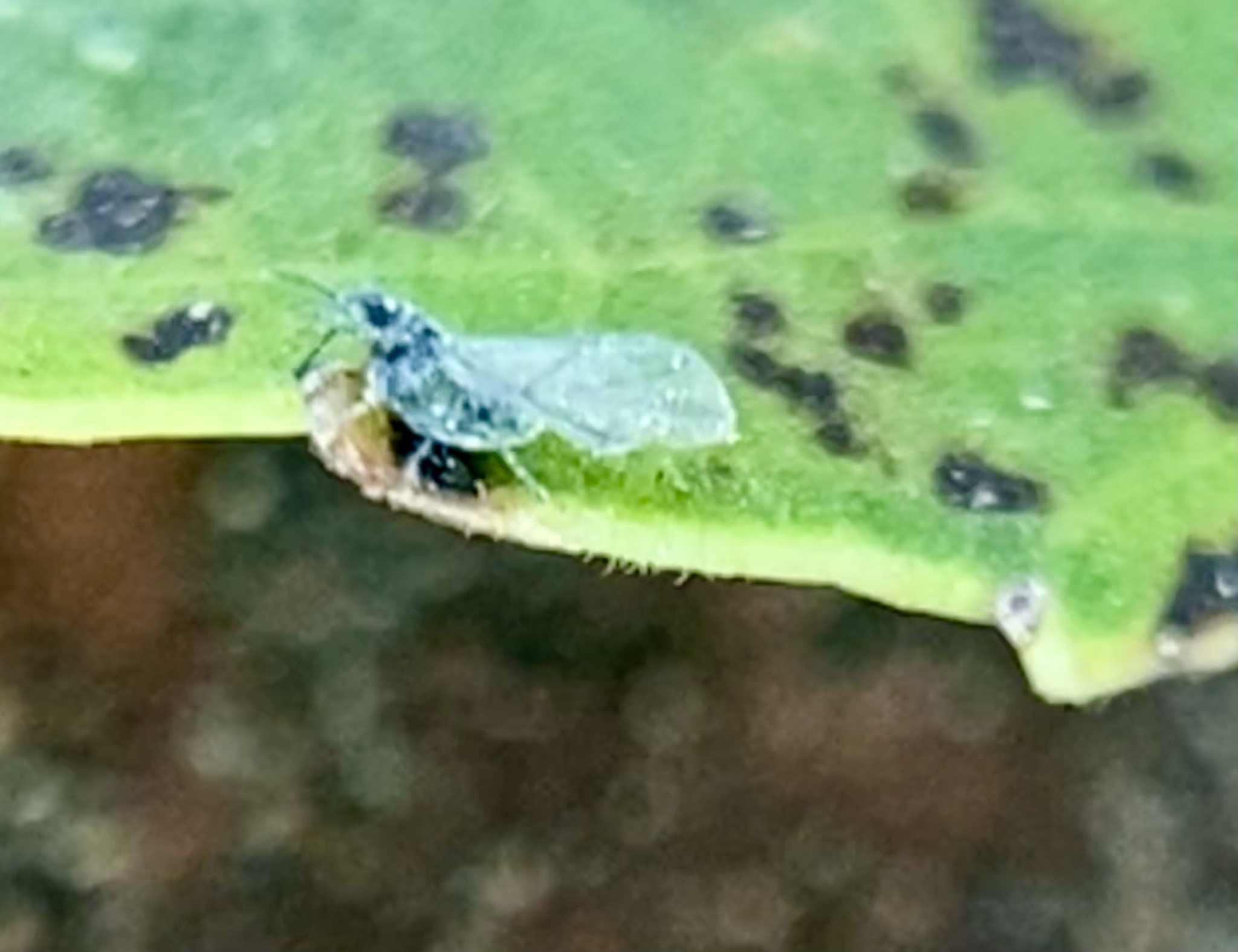

Scientific classification
- Kingdom: Animalia
- Phylum: Arthropoda
- Class: Insecta
- Order: Hemiptera
- Suborder: Sternorrhyncha
- Family: Aphididae
- Genus: Pemphigus
- Species: P. populitransversus

Binomial name
- Pemphigus populitransversus (Riley, 1879)

= Pemphigus populitransversus =

Species of insect

Pemphigus populitransversus also known as poplar petiole gall aphid or cabbage root aphid, induces galls on the leaves of poplar trees.

== Description ==
=== Insect ===
Adults are 1.6-2.6 mm in length. They lack cornicles on the abdomen and have relatively short antennae and legs compared to other aphid species.

=== Gall ===
Galls are induced by female Pemphigus populitransversus on the base of leaves in black cottonwood, narrowleaf cottonwood, fremont cottonwood, and aspen trees. The female P. populitransversus then lays her eggs inside of it. These galls are green or red, fleshy, smooth, and up to 14 mm in diameter. A slit allows the aphids to exit the gall.

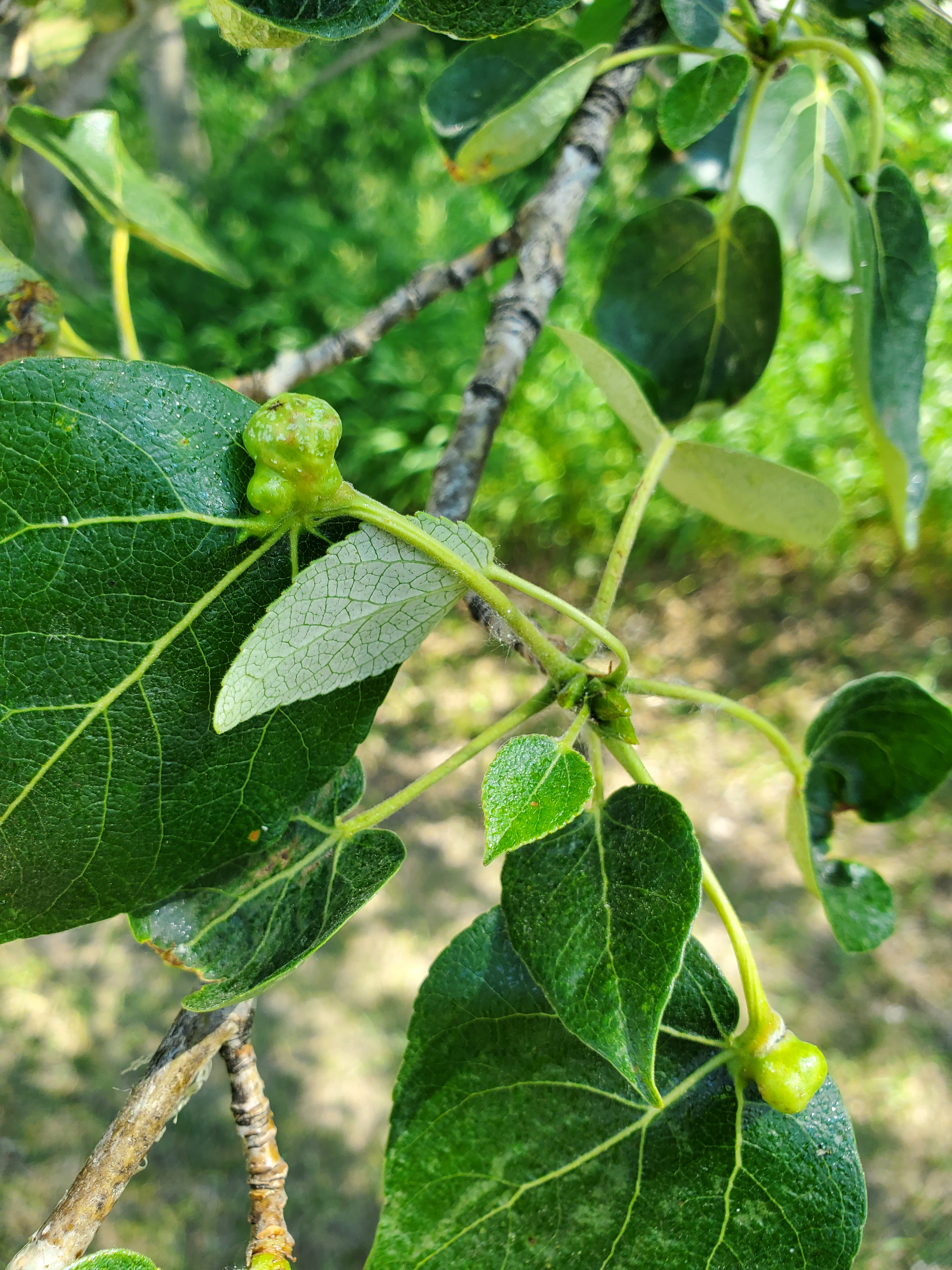
Galls on a poplar tree

Alternate hosts are in the Brassica family. In these, galls form in the roots.
