= Pemphigus matsumurai =

Scientific classification
- Kingdom: Animalia
- Phylum: Arthropoda
- Class: Insecta
- Order: Hemiptera
- Suborder: Sternorrhyncha
- Family: Aphididae
- Subfamily: Eriosomatinae
- Genus: Pemphigus
- Species: P. matsumurai

Binomial name
- Pemphigus matsumurai Kota Monzen, 1927

Synonyms
- Pemphigus montanus Narzikulov, 1957; Pemphigus niishimae (Ambiguous); Pemphigus niisimae (Ambiguous); Pemphigus (Pemphigus) matsumurai Monzen, 1927

Species of aphid

Pemphigus (Pemphigus) matsumurai is a species of gall-forming aphid, in the subgenus, Pemphigus, of the genus, Pemphigus. It was first described in 1927 by the Japanese entomologist Kota Monzen. Some authorities consider it a synonym of Pemphigus (Pemphigus) niishimae. Others do not. The species epithet, mutsumurai, honours the Japanese entomologist Shōnen Matsumura.

It is found on the Korean Peninsula, in Japan, China, Siberia, and possibly elsewhere.
