= Cottonwood River =

Cottonwood River may refer to one of four rivers in North America:

- Cottonwood River (Kansas), a tributary of the Neosho River
- Cottonwood River (Minnesota), a tributary of the Minnesota River
- Cottonwood River (Dease River tributary), originating in the northern Stikine Ranges of British Columbia
- Cottonwood River (Fraser River tributary), originating in Cariboo District, British Columbia, Canada
- Little Cottonwood River, a tributary of the Minnesota River

== See also ==
- Cottonwood (disambiguation)
