= Celtis conferta =

Conservation status
- Least Concern (IUCN 3.1)

Scientific classification
- Kingdom: Plantae
- Clade: Embryophytes
- Clade: Tracheophytes
- Clade: Angiosperms
- Clade: Eudicots
- Clade: Rosids
- Order: Rosales
- Family: Cannabaceae
- Genus: Celtis
- Species: C. conferta

Binomial name
- Celtis conferta Planch. (1873)

Species of flowering plant

Celtis conferta, commonly known as cottonwood, is a flowering plant in the hemp and hackberry family. It is a tree with a disjunct range in New Caledonia and Lord Howe Island. Two subspecies are recognized.

== Subspecies ==
- Celtis conferta subsp. conferta — New Caledonia
- Celtis conferta subsp. amblyphylla — Lord Howe Island
