= Cotton tree =

Cotton tree may refer to:

- Cotton Tree (Sierra Leone), a kapok tree (Ceiba pentandra) that is an historic symbol of Freetown in Sierra Leone
- Bombax ceiba, a plant species commonly known as cotton tree
- Gossypium, the cotton plant, which can grow from a bush to a tree

== Places ==
- Cotton Tree, Queensland, a neighborhood in Maroochydore, Queensland, Australia
- Cottontree, a hamlet in Lancashire, England, sometimes spelt Cotton Tree

== See also ==
- Cottonwood (disambiguation)
- Bombax, a genus of plants often called "silk cotton tree", "red cotton tree", or "kapok tree"
- Kapok tree (disambiguation), several plant species
- Silk-cotton tree, several plant species
- Hibiscus tiliaceus, a flowering tree sometimes known as the cottonwood tree
