= Pemphigus betae =

Scientific classification
- Kingdom: Animalia
- Phylum: Arthropoda
- Clade: Pancrustacea
- Class: Insecta
- Order: Hemiptera
- Suborder: Sternorrhyncha
- Family: Aphididae
- Genus: Pemphigus
- Species: P. betae

Binomial name
- Pemphigus betae Doane, 1900

Synonyms
- Pemphigus balsamiferae Williams, 1911

Species of true bug

Pemphigus betae, also known as the sugarbeet root aphid, is a species of gall-forming aphid that forms galls specifically on the commonly found narrowleaf cottonwood (a.k.a. the willow-leaved poplar tree), Populus angustifolia. Sugarbeet root aphids have been found in North America and Europe. They infect sugarbeets, but also other plants like tablebeets and Swiss chard. Their size has been likened to that of a pinhead, and are pale white-yellow in color. Sugarbeet root aphids have soft bodies that are bulbous in shape, with mandibular parts that can pierce and suck and paired abdominal tubes that point backwards, and come in both winged and wingless forms. They are known for their consequential effects on agriculture due to infestation of plants, and efforts to control the pests have proved to be difficult.

== Description ==
Sugarbeet root aphids have a body length of 1.9–2.4 mm (0.075–0.094 in). They are characterized to be as small as pinheads, and take on a pale white-yellow color. They have globular bodies that are soft, with mandibular parts that allow them to pierce and suck and paired abdominal tubes that point backwards. There are both winged and wingless sugarbeet root aphids.

== Habitat ==
The sugarbeet root aphid is found throughout the major sugarbeet growing areas of North America, (in the Nearctic area) and has infested areas in Texas, California, Michigan, and Alberta, Canada; it has also been introduced in Europe. The aphid has been recorded at only a few sites in Europe, but the data on other species of aphids suggest that they can increase their range of occurrence, often quickly and in an invasive manner. Infestations are usually more severe under dry soil conditions, either due to dry years in dry land conditions in the upper Midwest of the United States, or to using less water in the irrigated areas of the West and Southwest United States. Infestations are usually the most severe during July and late August.

Most species of aphids, at all stages of development, move about over the surface of their host plants and even between adjacent plants. These local movements result in slow diffusive dispersal. In contrast, aphids also show persistent 'straightened out' movements during which their vegetative responses are depressed; these movements are a means of transport over larger distances. Local 'trivial' movements and distant 'migratory' movements can be recognized, and it is possible that they are the extremes of a continuum of movement that disperses all species of aphids.

== Dispersal ==
Dispersal creates a relatively high mortality rate for sugarbeet root aphids. Additionally, alate aphids incur other disadvantages: if aphids fly then they may incur an additional cost in that their potential fecundity is further reduced and there is a further delay in the onset of reproduction. The combined effect is a marked reduction in reproductive potential and rate of increase. Although dispersal results in the colonization of suitable plants, it is not always clear what advantages there are in dispersing except from annual plants that are about to die. As dispersal can be costly in terms of fecundity or survival, or both, then sugarbeet root aphids are likely to delay departure until host quality falls below the average expectation for the habitat.

== Behavior ==
=== Life cycle ===
In the spring, a female nymph (also known as a stem mother) emerges from an overwintering egg and initiates a gall on one of the leaves of the Populus tree. The gall forms around the stem mother, who begins to reproduce parthenogenically while feeding on the leaf's phloem sap. Each stem mother is capable of creating up to 300 progeny per gall. The gall occupants develop wings in the middle of the summer and disperse from the gall to deposit their larvae in the ground. These larvae colonize and feed on the roots of nearby Chenopodiaceae plants for the rest of the summer. In the summer, they form alate migrants that fly back to the Populus tree and asexually produce sexual males and females whose sole purpose is to mate, as they lack mouthparts to feed. The product of sexual reproduction is a single egg in each female which is deposited in the tree's bark and left to overwinter.

=== Leaf colonization ===
Sugarbeet root aphids are closely synchronized with their hosts Populus augustifolia, with the majority of stem mothers colonizing leaves within three days after the leaf buds burst. There is intense competition between Pemphigus stem mothers over leaf choice - galls formed on larger leaves have higher stem mother weight, more aphids overall, and a lower probability of being aborted. Moreover, galls formed closer to the leaf stem-and thus closer to the source of nutrients flowing into the leaf-also benefit in the same way. During the aphids' emergence in the spring, large Populus leaves are colonized first. Once a stem mother forms a gall, she is more reluctant to move to a new leaf even if the current one withers, though the ability to colonize a large, healthy leaf close to its stem is crucial in ensuring an aphid's reproductive success.

On average, stem mothers distribute themselves among the leaves of a Populus tree according to the ideal free distribution model. Stem mothers sharing a leaf have to split the available resources, and this sharing comes at a cost to the stem mother's reproductive success. Two stem mothers sharing a leaf spend a significant amount of their time engaging in territorial behavior instead of feeding or gall forming. Thus, stem mothers sharing a leaf produce less offspring than single stem mothers on leaves of the same size. When one stem mother is removed from a shared leaf, the reproductive success of the remaining occupant(s) rise accordingly. Some stem mothers choose to settle alone on smaller leaves instead of sharing a larger leaf with another individual. This creates a scenario where, on average, there is no difference between the reproductive success of stem mothers occupying leaves singly and stem mothers sharing leaves with other individuals.

As a result of the importance of leaf choice in their reproductive success, sugarbeet root aphid stem mothers are highly territorial and will compete with each other for the chance to form galls at the bases of the largest leaves. This competition usually takes the form of kicking and shoving contests; two stem mothers will align rear-to-rear and push against the other forcefully using their hind legs. The winner of these contests then settles closest to the leaf base, and the loser settles more distally. If the basal stem mother dies or is removed, the distal stem mother often moves down to the base of the gall to replace her. These territorial contests are unusually long, and can span the course of several days. A side effect of this intense territorial competition is the creation of a "floater population" of unsettled stem mothers searching for unoccupied leaves.

=== Gall formation ===
==== Stem mothers and gall choice ====
Sugarbeet root aphid stem mothers induce gall formation in the leaf by probing the leaf tissue with their stylets. This leads to the formation of a small depression on the leaf, which eventually closes up over the stem mother and forms a gall. The extent of the probing activity dictates gall size, and removing the stem mother early on in the process leads to the formation of an unclosed, rudimentary gall. The extent of probing activity is correlated with the aphid's reproductive success. The probing activity may also serve a secondary purpose in helping the aphid determine leaf size. Leaf size is an important factor in determining what leaf a stem mother chooses to develop a gall on, but at the time of leaf colonization, leaves that are being colonized are only a tenth to a quarter of their mature size. It has been suggested that, during the probing of the leaf, the stem mother gauges the chemical environment of the leaf and uses that as a predictor of final leaf size and suitability as a gall site. Aphids possess chemosensory organs, allowing them to respond to a variety of stimuli from the plant, both those of the volatile variety (olfaction) and non-volatile variety (taste). Once the aphid is on a plant, it tests the surface of plant with its antennae and probes the plant with its mouth parts. The antennae contain many sensilla, allowing them to sense tactile and chemical stimuli.

==== Stem mothers and their progeny ====
At the onset of autumn in temperate regions many species switch to the production of sexual forms, with each clone producing both egg-laying females and males. This switch is triggered by the longer nights in the autumn. Both sexual males and sexual females are produced parthenogenetically in response to external and/or internal cues, such as the amount of food present, the amount of daylight, and the quality of the leaf. However, sugarbeet root aphids are also capable of reproducing sexually. Aphids predominate in the temperate regions of the world; to overwinter in a cold-resistant resting stage, the fertilized egg, is an adaptation to temperate conditions. One possible short-term advantage of sex is that it generates siblings with a range of genotypes, and a range is more likely to include the fittest genotype for a particular patch than the single genotype of an asexual sibling-ship would. Thus, genetically diverse siblings could have more 'elbow-room' as they are potentially capable of exploiting more than one kind of leaf-patch.

=== Interaction with the leaf ===
The benefits of settling basally are significant, with basal stem mothers producing 49-65% more offspring than their distally settled counterparts. The benefits of settling basally relate to the aphid's ability to manipulate the plant's food resources. The galls formed by sugarbeet root aphids act as physiologic sinks, diverting and intercepting the plant's normal transport of resources and nutrients. ^{14}C labeling experiments have shown that their galls intercept resources being transported from the midvein to the distal parts of the leaf. In addition, these galls are able to divert ^{14}C from neighboring leaves. One study showed that, on average, 29% of the ^{14}C accumulating inside a basal gall was supplied by a neighboring leaf and not the leaf the gall itself was on. In contrast, neighboring leaves only supplied 7% of a distal gall's ^{14}C, illustrating the importance of settling basally.

=== Tree colonization ===
After emerging in the autumn, the migrant forms of sugarbeet root aphids seek out Populus trees to colonize. These migrant forms are short-lived, and usually die within 12 to 48 hours. In selecting trees to colonize, the autumn migrants of sugarbeet root aphids prefer to colonize larger trees over smaller ones, and are likely to use simple cues such as tree crown size or tree resistance to colonization to decide on which trees to colonize. Despite the importance of leaf size to stem mothers, autumn migrants do not appear to take leaf size into consideration when choosing a tree to colonize.

== Agricultural impact ==
Sugarbeet roots have become a common crop for sucrose production in the northern United States. A concern among farmers is the impact that sugarbeet root aphids can have on these crops, which are colonized by and used as secondary hosts for sugarbeet root aphids.

=== Effect on crops ===
The lifecycle of sugarbeet root aphids involves primary and secondary host plants. Galls are formed on the primary host, cottonwood, in the spring by the stem mother. Her wingless offspring, called apterae, feed on the gall until giving rise to winged individuals called alatae. These alatae break out of the gall and colonize the roots of their secondary hosts, sugarbeet.

These individuals then suck the sap from the sugarbeet roots, which causes them to lose their color, wilt, and die. Infestation is apparent where they appear as circular patches in which plants and leaves are wilted and dying. During dry years when cracks form in the soil, the secondary host roots become much more accessible to the aphids, which can lead to severe yield loss.

=== Economic costs ===
The economic impact of sugarbeet root aphids on sugarbeet crops in southwestern Minnesota was studied during the 1990 and 1991 growing seasons. The effects of infestation on yield and quality of sugarbeet root showed that loss of sucrose content in the plant was the primary reason for reduced quality. In addition, yield rates were significantly higher in 1991 due to higher levels of precipitation.

Further studies have shown that sugarbeet root aphid infestation is most prevalent in the upper Midwest during drought years, and in the southwest during times of low irrigation. Sometimes, despite dry conditions, cool weather can decrease the prevalence of sugarbeet root aphid infestations.

=== Pest control and management ===
Although certain control methods are effective on other root-feeding arthropods, control measures for sugarbeet root aphids are more difficult. Crop rotation and simple foliar and postemergence insecticides are usually ineffective. However, Knox Out 2FM and Counter 15G have proven to be effective in containing infestations, although some states, such as California, currently have no chemicals registered for use on the sugarbeet root aphid. Biological controls, such as introduction of fungal diseases or natural predators, may also serve as an effective means of pest control. Although it is unlikely that biological controls are fully capable of controlling sugarbeet root aphid populations, future research may increase their role in management.

To properly manage damaged and infested areas, it is necessary to thoroughly work these areas and destroy plants left in the ground for the following harvest. Weeds in the infested areas should be destroyed, equipment should be cleaned, and infested fields should not be used for at least three years. Water stresses should be avoided in order to prevent yield loss due to water-stressed sugarbeets.
