= Genetic Algorithm for Rule Set Production =

Genetic Algorithm for Rule Set Production (GARP) is a computer program based on genetic algorithm that creates ecological niche models for species. The generated models describe environmental conditions (precipitation, temperatures, elevation, etc.) under which the species should be able to maintain populations. As input, local observations of species and related environmental parameters are used which describe potential limits of the species' capabilities to survive. Such environmental parameters are commonly stored in geographical information systems. A GARP model is a random set of mathematical rules which can be read as limiting environmental conditions. Each rule is considered as a gene; the set of genes is combined in random ways to further generate many possible models describing the potential of the species to occur.

Software:

- OpenModeller
- Lifemapper

== See also ==
- Environmental niche modelling
