= Ideal free distribution =

Model of spatial distribution of organisms

In ecology, an ideal free distribution (IFD) is a theoretical way in which a population's individuals distribute themselves among several patches of resources within their environment, in order to minimize resource competition and maximize fitness. The theory states that the number of individual animals that will aggregate in various patches is proportional to the amount of resources available in each. For example, if patch A contains twice as many resources as patch B, there will be twice as many individuals foraging in patch A as in patch B.

The term "ideal" implies that animals are aware of each patch's quality, and they choose to forage in the patch with the highest quality. The term "free" implies that animals are capable of moving unhindered from one patch to another. Although these assumptions are not always upheld in nature, there are still many experiments that have been performed in support of IFD, even if populations naturally deviate between patches before reaching IFD. IFD theory can still be used to analyze foraging behaviors of animals, whether those behaviors support IFD, or violate it.

== Assumptions and predictions ==
The ideal free distribution theory is based on several assumptions and predictions as indicated below;

=== Assumptions ===
1) Each available patch has an individual quality that is determined by the amount of resources available in each patch. Given that there is not yet any competition in each patch, individuals can assess the quality of each patch based merely on the resources available.

2) Individuals are free to move to the highest quality patch. However, this can be violated by dominant individuals within a species who may keep a weaker individual from reaching the ideal patch.

3) Individuals are aware of the value of each patch so that they can choose the ideal patch.

4) Increasing the number of individuals in a given patch reduces the quality of that patch, through either increased scramble competition or increased interference competition.

5) All individuals are competitively equal, so they are all equally able to forage and choose the ideal patch.

=== Predictions ===
Once the assumptions are met, IFD theory predicts that a population of individuals will distribute themselves equally among patches with the same intrinsic value. Various deviations may occur initially, but eventually the patches will accommodate the number of individuals that is proportional to the amount of resources they each contain. In this case, patches of equal intrinsic value allow for the same number of individuals in each patch. At this point, the state of the individuals is referred to as Nash equilibrium. Once the individuals are in Nash equilibrium, any migration to a different patch will be disadvantageous since all individuals obtain the same benefits.

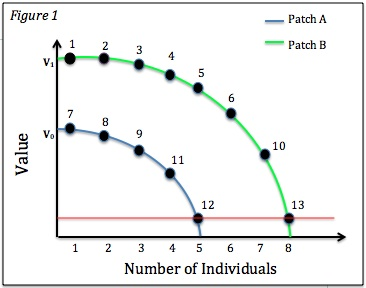
Figure 1

For patches with unequal innate values, or intrinsic values, we can still apply the same distribution principle. However, it is predicted that the number of individuals in each patch will differ, as the amount of resources in each patch will be unequal. They will still reach Nash equilibrium despite the fact that there is an unequal number of competitors in each patch. This equilibrium is demonstrated as the red line in Figure 1, where the feeding rate is the same for all individuals even though there are 5 individuals in Patch A and 8 individuals in Patch B. From the figure, we can infer that the first 6 foragers settle in Patch B due to its greater intrinsic quality, but the increased competition causes the lesser quality Patch A to be more beneficial for the seventh individual. This figure is depicting the habitat matching effect, through which the ratio of individuals at the patches corresponds to the ratio of resources available in those patches.

== Support ==
=== Experimental data ===
Anelosimus eximius, a species of social spiders, live together cooperatively and build large web communities. Number of insects caught decreases with increasing population due to surface area scaling, but prey mass increases due to larger webs. At intermediate population size of 1000, prey biomass per capita was maximized. The results correspond to observed results of population size and ecological conditions- areas that lack larger insects have smaller spider communities.

Bumblebees distribute themselves systematically so that there was an equalization of gain per flower (the currency) in flowers of different nectar production. Bees are also distributed proportionally based on plant density and differential nectar distribution. In African wild dog, observed pack size did not agree with results of daily per capita food intake. However, when factoring in distance traveled to hunt into the currency, observed pack size was close to optimal.

=== Unequal competitors ===
The ideal free distribution hypothesis assumes that all individuals are equal in competitive abilities. However, there is experimental evidence that demonstrates that even when the competitive abilities, or weights, of individuals in a population differ, the ideal free distribution is still mostly upheld as long as these differences are accounted for. In accounting for this variety of competitive weights, animals distribute such that their competitive weights in each habitat match the proportion of resources present there. For example, in one experiment goldfish differing in competitive ability behaved in a way that maximized their intake rate relative to their competitive weight. Since the mean rank of fish in a site varied inversely with the total number of fish in both the high resource density site and the low resource density site, there was no correlation between competitive ability and time spent at the higher resource density site. As expected in an ideally distributed population of goldfish of different competitive abilities, the intake rate of each competitive weight did not differ between the sites.

Additionally, foraging behavior in coho salmon does not uphold ideal free distribution predicted by the equal competitors model, but does uphold ideal free distribution with the inclusion of competitive inequalities. In other words, the distribution of the number of fish was significantly different from the distribution of the competitive weights. When exposed to a poor patch and a good patch, the fish distributed such that the payoffs per unit of competitive weight were the same at both patches. This experiment demonstrates that the incorporation of competitive weights into habitat selection can improve predictions of animal distributions.

In another example, competition between sugarbeet root aphid stem mothers for galling sites on the leaves of Populus angustifolia has also been shown to generally follow the Ideal Free Distribution. After hatching in the spring, female aphids compete with each other for galling sites closest to the stems of the largest leaves. Both settling on a smaller leaf and sharing a leaf with another aphid reduce a stem mother's reproductive success, but the aphids settle in such a way that the average reproductive success for individuals on leaves with one, two, or three galls is the same. However, reproductive success is unequal within the same leaf, and stem mothers that settle closer to the base of the leaf have higher fitness than those that settle distally.

Variations in competitive abilities of individuals in a given population also tend to result in several different possible Nash equilibrium distributions that each maintains ideal free distribution. For example, if good competitors forage twice as well as poor competitors, a possible scenario upholding IFD would be for four good competitors and eight poor competitors to forage at a given site, each gaining the same net payoff per unit of competitive weight. Additional combinations upholding IFD could exist as well. Even when individuals move between patches in a suboptimal fashion, this distribution of possible equilibria is unaffected.

== Shortcomings ==
Though the Ideal Free Distribution can be used to explain the behaviors of several species, it is not a perfect model. There remain many situations in which the IFD does not accurately predict the behavioral outcome.

=== Deviation from the IFD ===
As an optimal foraging model, the Ideal Free Distribution predicts that the ratio of individuals between two foraging sites will match the ratio of resources in those two sites. This prediction is similar to the Matching Law of individual choice, which states that an individual's rate of response will be proportional to the positive reinforcement that individual receives for that response. So an animal will go to the patch that provides the most benefits to them.

However, this prediction assumes that each individual will act on its own. It does not hold for situations involving group choice, which is an example of social behavior. In 2001, Kraft et al. performed an experiment that tested the IFD's predictions of group choice using humans. This experiment involved groups of participants choosing between blue and red cards in order to earn points towards prizes. When the groups’ choice of cards was graphed in relation to the ratios between the points, the slopes demonstrated some undermatching, which is a deviation from the Matching Law. Undermatching is the situation when the ratio of foragers between two patches (in this case, how many people picked each card) is less than the ratio of resources between the two patches (the points each card is worth). The results show that the IFD could not predict the outcome. However, they also show that it is possible to apply the Ideal Free Distribution to group choice, if that group choice is motivated by the individuals’ tendencies to maximize positive reinforcement.

=== Experimental data not in support of IFD ===
It is important to keep in mind that IFD does rely on the assumptions previously stated and that all of these qualities are probably not met in the wild. Some believe that tests of IFD are not executed properly and therefore yield results that appear to follow the prediction but in reality do not. This causes animal behaviorists to be split in opinions of whether IFD is a true phenomenon or not.

In experiments that test the predictions of IFD, most often there tends to be proportionately more individuals in the least profitable patch and a shortage at the richest patch. A pattern also known as "resource dilution" in contra-distinction to the resource concentration hypothesis. This distribution (resource dilution) is found across species of insects, fish and birds. However, modifications to the original assumptions have been made and are implemented in experiments involving IFD.

One experiment displayed this violation of IFD in stickleback fish. He saw that the actual observations and the ones stated by IFD were not congruent. More fish tended to disperse in the patch with less daphnia (the sought after food source) and the more abundant patch had a shortage of visitors. Cichlid fish also displayed the same subtle difference in predicted vs. actual dispersal numbers in relation to resources.

Kennedy and Gray utilized the matching law in order to reanalyze IFD experiments. When psychologists perform tests of this law, they use more sensitive measures to account for deviation from strict matching relationships. Kennedy and Gray utilize this method to test the validity of previous IFD experiments. Using this analysis, they can account for under-matching when the distribution is less extreme than the resource rate. When one patch is seen to have more preference over another, bias in the resource ratio is taken into consideration. These two matching relationships are assessed by a regression of the log ratio of the numbers at each site against the log ratio of resources at the site.

The results they found do not support IFD predictions and some take this outcome to mean that the current model is too simple. Animal behaviorists have proposed a modification to the model that denotes an ultimate outcome of a population always having more individuals on the least profitable site and less on the more resource abundant site. Knowledge of the competitive interactions, effects of travel between sites, number of animals in population, perceptual abilities of these animals, and the relative and absolute resource availability on each patch is required to accurately predict the distribution of a foraging population.

== See also ==
- Behavioural ecology
- Marginal value theorem
- Optimal foraging theory
- Xylocopa sonorina (organism, bee, that exhibits Ideal Free Distribution)
