= Pemphigus obesinymphae =

Scientific classification
- Domain: Eukaryota
- Kingdom: Animalia
- Phylum: Arthropoda
- Class: Insecta
- Order: Hemiptera
- Suborder: Sternorrhyncha
- Family: Aphididae
- Subfamily: Eriosomatinae
- Genus: Pemphigus
- Species: P. obesinymphae

Binomial name
- Pemphigus obesinymphae Aoki & Moran, 1994

Species of aphid

Pemphigus obesinymphae is a species of gall-forming aphid. It creates galls on the leaves of Populus fremontii. The species is the only North American aphid known to have soldiers, first instar nymphs that defend the colony.
