= Paul Buchner (researcher) =

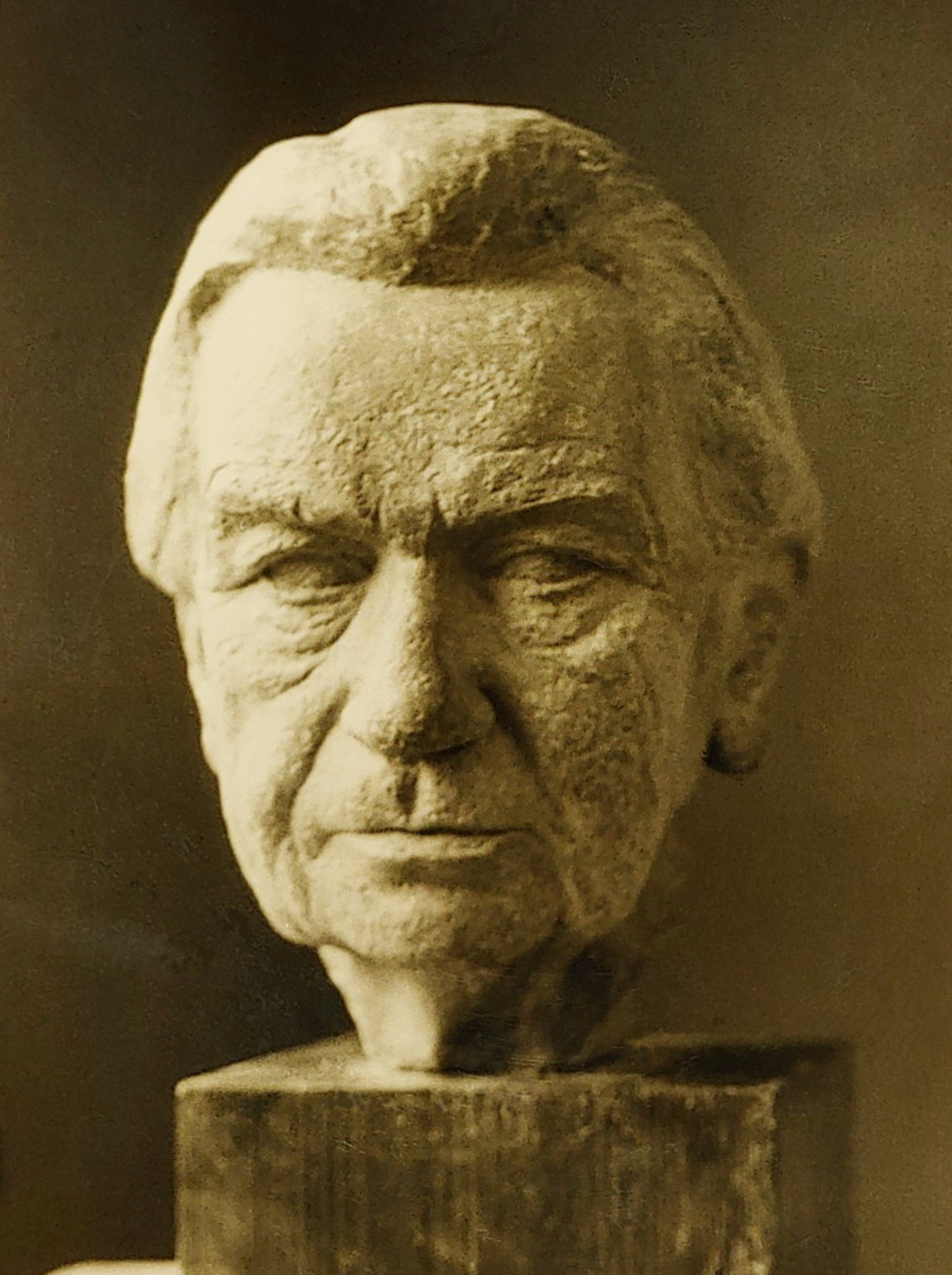

Paul Buchner (1886–1978) was a German researcher who studied insects and bacteriology including hereditary symbiosis (Symbiogenesis).

He studied Hemiptera and their symbionts.

The bacteria Buchnera, an aphid endosymbiont, is named for him.

== Publishings ==
- Endosymbiosis of Animals with Plant Microorganisms (1965) originally published 1953
