= Cottonwood Island =

Cottonwood Island may refer to:

- Cottonwood Island (Nevada)
- Cottonwood Island (Washington)
