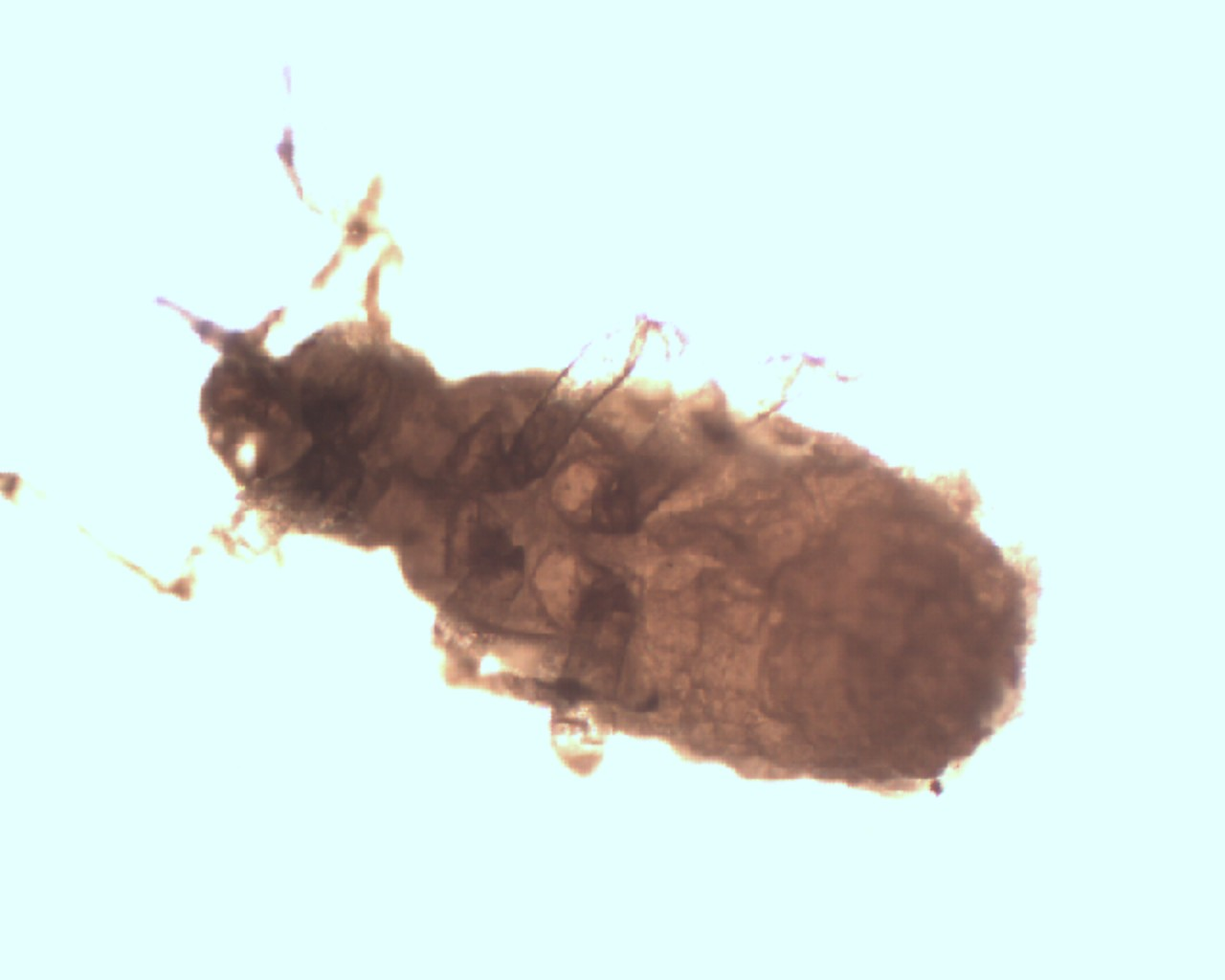
- Microscope view

Scientific classification
- Kingdom: Animalia
- Phylum: Arthropoda
- Clade: Pancrustacea
- Class: Insecta
- Order: Hemiptera
- Suborder: Sternorrhyncha
- Family: Aphididae
- Genus: Pemphigus
- Species: P. spyrothecae

Binomial name
- Pemphigus spyrothecae Passerini, 1860

= Pemphigus spyrothecae =

Species of true bug

Pemphigus spyrothecae, or the poplar spiral gall aphid, is a social insect which exhibits apparent altruistic behaviors. The aphids form galls and act as colony defenders, at times sacrificing their own lives to do so. It has been shown that colony defense is more likely in habitats that are difficult to obtain and can hold a large number of individuals. These gall locations are crucial because plants have a short window in which a gall can be produced. Thus, it is important for there to be a defense system that enables the aphids to retain their galls. The need for defense arises when the gall is opened up to allow winged aphid migrants to leave and to release any waste. The process of repairing the holes can take up to 10 days; during this time, the gall is susceptible to intruding predators.

== Description ==
P. spyrothecae is green, red or yellow in color and smooth to the touch. The outer surface of this species develops as the edges of the petiole of Populus nigra thicken, flatten and twist. In parallel to the petiole's shape, a gall forms into a spiral shape similar to that of the inside of a snail's shell. The fundatrix, or parthenogenetic female aphid produced on the primary host plant from an overwintering fertilized egg, is pale green; these individuals allow the second generation alatae to form within the gall. The galls typically mature in late August to early September and change color from green to red over the course of maturation. At this stage, the alatae exit the gall through many small pores along the spirals' seams. In terms of geographical distribution, P. spyrothecae are distributed across Europe, North Africa (Tunisia), western Siberia, Pakistan and some locations within Canada.

== Taxonomy ==
Pemphigus spyrothecae is in the superfamily Aphidoidea, in the hymopterous division of the order Hemiptera, which consists of insects with sucking parts of the mouth. P. spyrothecae is a member of the suborder Sternorrhyncha, which includes scale insects, psyllids, whiteflies, aphids. These organisms have two pairs of membranous wings and a flexible forewing, along with an herbivorous diet. As a member of the family Aphididae, which consists of the aphids or plantlice, this species consists of soft-bodied insects that live in colonies on their host plants. Furthermore, the Aphididae include winged or wingless forms, with six-segment antennae. Every species of this family has a dual-segmented tarsi with the second segment having two claws. A pair of short cornicles protrude from the last abdominal segment, in addition to the cauda, a posterior projection on the tip of the abdomen. Pemphigus spyrothecae is included in the genus Pemphigus.

== Behavior and ecology ==
=== Altruistic soldier caste ===
==== Early characterization of the aphid "soldier" ====
The aphid soldier exhibits its first distinguishing physical traits as a first-instar nymph, the phase following its complete maturation in the egg. There are two types of first instar nymphs within galls: one type of nymph is thick-legged and attacks insects introduced into galls. Another type of nymph is normal-legged. Monomorphic first-instar nymphs of Pemphigus dorocola attack moth larvae, a predator, when it is experimentally introduced to the gall. After observing a physical resemblance between these aphids and the thick-legged P. spyrothecae larvae, Aoki suggested that these insects also defended the gall. His prediction was confirmed, as he later observed a caste between normal-legged first-instar nymphs as "reproductives-to-be" and the thick-legged nymphs as defenders, or in his words, "soldiers". This was later deemed the first discovery of aphid soldiers from a locality outside of East Asia. These soldiers have different morphological states from other members of the species. First, the first-instar soldiers tend to be more aggressive. They also have thick hind legs and a stylet, which is used to attack invaders.

==== Fortress defense ====
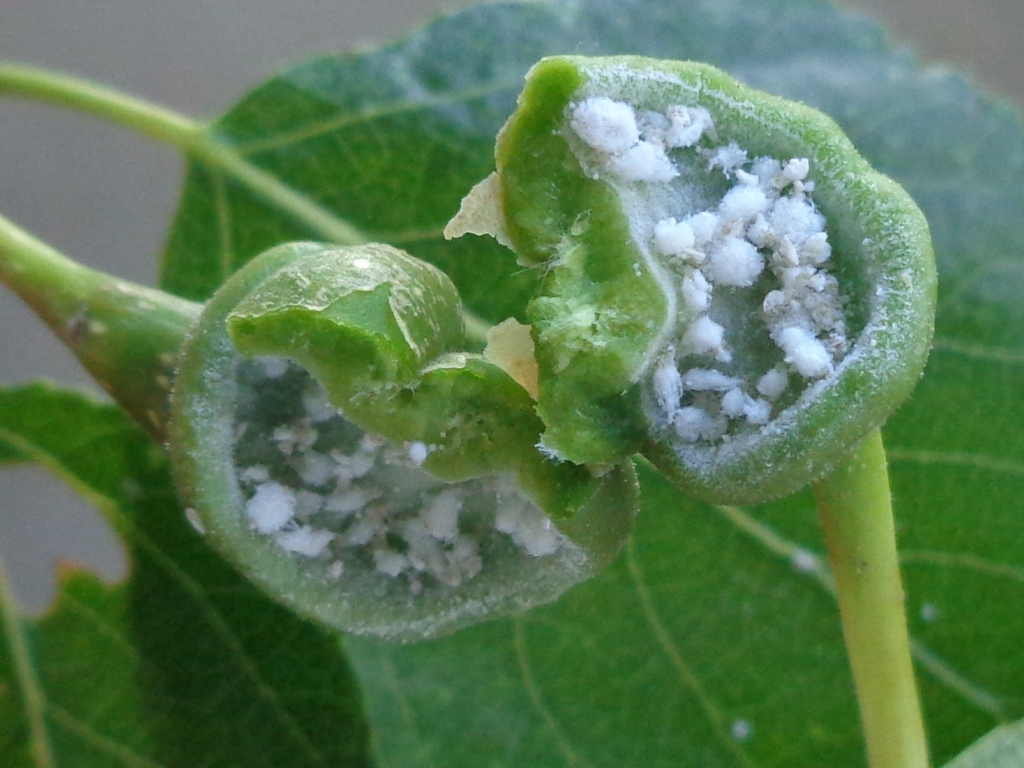
Pemphigus spyrothecae

P. spyrothecae is capable of fortress defense through manipulation of the composition of aphids in galls. When introduced to a single predator, colonies with soldiers usually killed the predator, incurring the loss of a few soldiers. In colonies with only non-soldiers, predators killed the aphids and ate them.

In a later study, Foster and Rhoden (1997) examined the effectiveness of soldiers in fortress defense. They manipulated the numbers of soldiers and non-soldiers in sets of galls that remained in contact with poplar trees at the research site. When there was a combination of soldiers and non-soldiers, the gall was ten times less likely to be attacked by a predator compared to a gall with only non-soldier aphids. These results led Foster and Rhoden to conclude that soldiers effectively defend against predation under natural conditions. Earlier laboratory experiments demonstrated that soldiers could prevent specialist gall predators from attacking the gall. However, in this study, Foster and Rhoden found that such protection could also take place in the field. Five different predators attack the P. spyrothecae galls: specialist A. minki, generalists S. ribesii and A. nemoralis and two other unidentified generalist predators.

==== Effectiveness of soldier attacks against predators ====
P. syprothecae, like other aphid species that attack predators, maintain a singular thrusting motion as they pierce the predator with their stylets. Repeated stabbing rarely occurs. This species can also utilize its legs—sometimes all six—in order to squeeze the predator. The purpose of this motion is to tear the predator's cuticle and ultimately rupture its internal structures. Although detailed quantitative observations were not included in the Rhoden and Foster study, the attacking behavior was deemed costly to the soldiers. Thus, a cost-benefit analysis most likely plays a role in a soldier's decision to attack the predator.

==== Influence of relatedness on the soldier caste ====
Since P. spyrothecae clonally reproduce, genetic relatedness within colonies is rather simple: an individual aphid is either a clone of its neighbors or it is not. Since every generation within the gall displays a high degree of relatedness due to cloning, any deviation from a colony's genetic uniformity (excluding mutation) can be traced back to intergall migration. The ease of intergall migration is rooted in the fact that the colonies are present in the galls on the primary host for a long period of time, only migrating once the summer has passed.

==== Clonal mixing and the soldier caste ====
The genetic relationships within aphid colonies help explain the evolution of the altruistic soldier hierarchy of P. spyrothecae. More specifically, with the utilization of field trapping and microsatellites, the researchers were able to examine the degree of clonal mixing in the colony. Clonal mixing is defined as the "mixing" of genes "individual from different clones… which will dilute the benefit of cooperation by wasting it on unrelated clones" (Johnson 1525). The researchers predicted that the reason that galls were a critical factor to the evolution of soldiers... Given the fact that a gall was defendable and valuable, the authors anticipated that this served as a barrier to the intrusion of other foreign clones via clonal mixing. Johnson et al. found that while soldiers typically migrate and have the capability to moult and reproduce outside of its own gall, clonal mixing was low overall. Given this insignificant level of clonal mixing, there is a low chance for barriers to the evolution and propagation of an altruistic soldier caste within the species. Ultimately, Johnson et al. (2002) became the first researchers to utilize species-specific nuclear DNA markers in order to get a clear sense of the degree of clonal diversity within the P. spyrothecae galls; with the additional usage of trapping data, their prediction of intergall migration was also confirmed.

==== Clonal mixing as an adaptive event ====
Since trapping data confirmed that all migrants are soldiers, Johnson et al. infer that these aphids can grow and produce winged emigrants in galls as an adaptive strategy of cloning instead of a chance event. This confirms the earlier belief that soldiers had evolved from specialized migrants. However, further studies on colonies where the level of clonal mixing is predicted to be high would enable researchers to gain a better understanding of the relationships between the degree of clonal mixing and soldier investment.

==== Fortress repair ====
Nest repair serves as a major example of eusociality within colonies of P. spyrothecae. After prematurely creating an opening in a gall of the same size and presentation of a natural opening, the researchers observed a higher degree of mortality from predation. In this circumstance, there was no evidence of greater investment in soldiers. So, the researchers concluded that the aphids do not adapt to short-term changes in the colony via a reduction of clonal mixing (an increase in soldier reproduction). However, they did note that the holes were repaired by compensatory regrowth from nearby areas of the gall that were either unharmed and/or protected from predation. The researchers found that the soldiers were most likely responsible for the repair, highlighting the expanse of the altruism within this complex soldier caste.

== Experiments ==
W. A. Foster outlined the effectiveness and methods of gall defense. He selected galls and placed them in laboratory conditions so that the predators and number of aphids could be controlled. Anthocoris minki was identified as the primary predator. It was shown that the first instar soldiers alone were responsible for the defense; they were successful in preventing predators from entering and killing them if they did. The sterile-soldiers tend to live closer to the gall opening while the sexually active aphids tend to live farthest from the opening. It was also found that some of the soldiers died in this act. When a ladybird larva (Adalia bipunctata) was introduced to the gall, the soldiers would walk onto the predator and insert their stylets into the predators cuticles and would occasionally pierce the cuticle with their hind legs. This experiment was also performed with only non-soldiers and in these scenarios the predator was not killed. This indicates that only the soldiers play a role in gall defense. While attacking a predator, haemolymph oozed out and caused the aphids to stick to predator. It was found that with larger predators, more aphids were stuck after the predator was defeated. The predator survival rate is related to the number of soldiers present; with only 50 soldiers 50% of predators died, and 100 soldiers 90% of predators died.

== The selfish gene ==
The primary explanation for this apparent altruism is explained through kinship; the average degree of mixing in P. spyrothecae was 0.68% which indicates a high relatedness between members of the gall. This now becomes clear that this is a selfish act in order to preserve their genes. This soldier trait has evolved 4 times independently in aphids; this shows the importance and benefits of this trait. Although the soldier aphids protect against predators, they seem to not have any tendencies of defense against immigrants of the same species, even though they are not clones.
