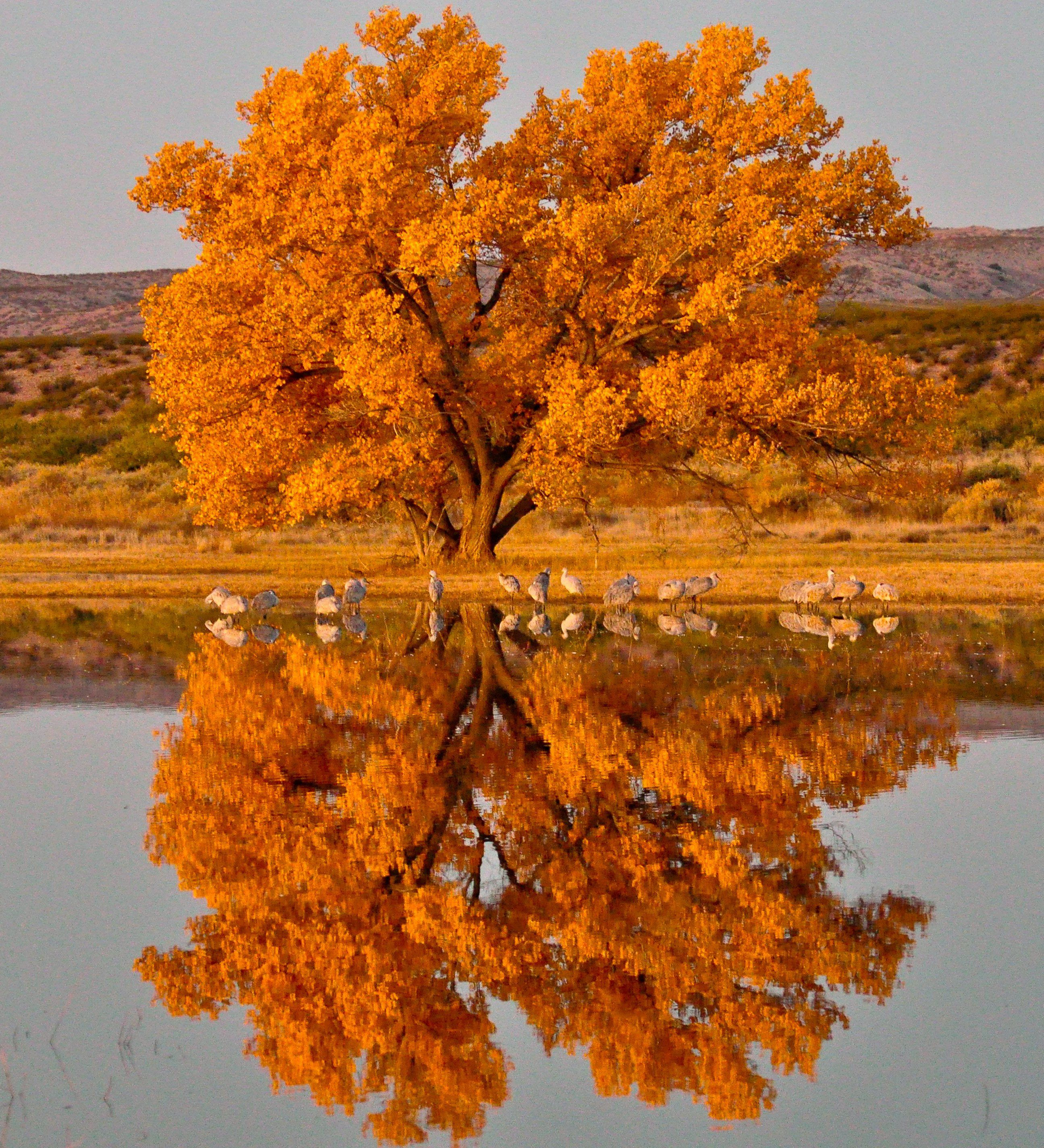
- Populus fremontii in fall color

Scientific classification
- Kingdom: Plantae
- Clade: Embryophytes
- Clade: Tracheophytes
- Clade: Spermatophytes
- Clade: Angiosperms
- Clade: Eudicots
- Clade: Rosids
- Order: Malpighiales
- Family: Salicaceae
- Genus: Populus
- Section: Populus sect. Aigeiros; Duby

Type species
- Populus nigra L.

Species
- Populus deltoides L.; Populus fremontii; Populus nigra L.

= Populus sect. Aigeiros =

Section of plants in the genus Populus

Populus section Aigeiros is a section of three species in the genus Populus, the poplars. Like some other species in the genus Populus, they are commonly known as cottonwoods. The species are native to North America, Europe, and western Asia. In the past, as many as six species were recognized, but recent trends have been to accept just three species, treating the others as subspecies of P. deltoides.

They are large, deciduous trees that are 15–30 m (50–100 ft) tall and diameters of 4 m (13 ft), distinguished by thick, deeply fissured bark and triangular-based to diamond-shaped leaves that are green on both sides (without the whitish wax on the undersides) and without any obvious balsam scent in spring. An important feature of the leaves is the petiole, which is flattened sideways so that the leaves have a particular type of movement in the wind.

Male and female flowers are in separate catkins, appearing before the leaves in spring. The seeds are borne on cottony structures that allow them to be blown long distances in the air before settling to ground.

The cottonwoods are exceptionally tolerant of flooding, erosion, and flood deposits filling around the trunk.

Although each of the three cottonwood species has a different leaf pattern, they all have the same general diamond leaf shape.

== Species ==
=== Populus deltoides ===
Eastern cottonwood (Populus deltoides) is one of the largest North American hardwood trees, although the wood is rather soft. It is a riparian zone tree. It occurs throughout the eastern United States, parts of southern Canada, and northern Mexico. The leaves are alternate and simple, with coarsely toothed (crenate/serrate) edges, and subcordate at the base. The leaf shape is roughly triangular, hence the species name, deltoides. Their winter buds are enrobed in a protective, fragrant resin that coats young leaves when they unfurl from the bud.

In the typical subspecies P. d. deltoides (Vermont south to northern Florida and west to about Michigan), the leaves are broad and triangular, 7–15 cm (2.8–5.9 in) across at the base. Further west (Minnesota south to eastern Texas), the subspecies P. d. monilifera (plains cottonwood; syn. P. sargentii) has somewhat narrower leaves, 5–10 cm wide at the base. This is also the state tree of Nebraska, Wyoming, and Kansas. In West Texas, New Mexico, and Colorado, the subspecies P. d. wislizeni (Rio Grande cottonwood; syn. P. wislizeni) occurs.

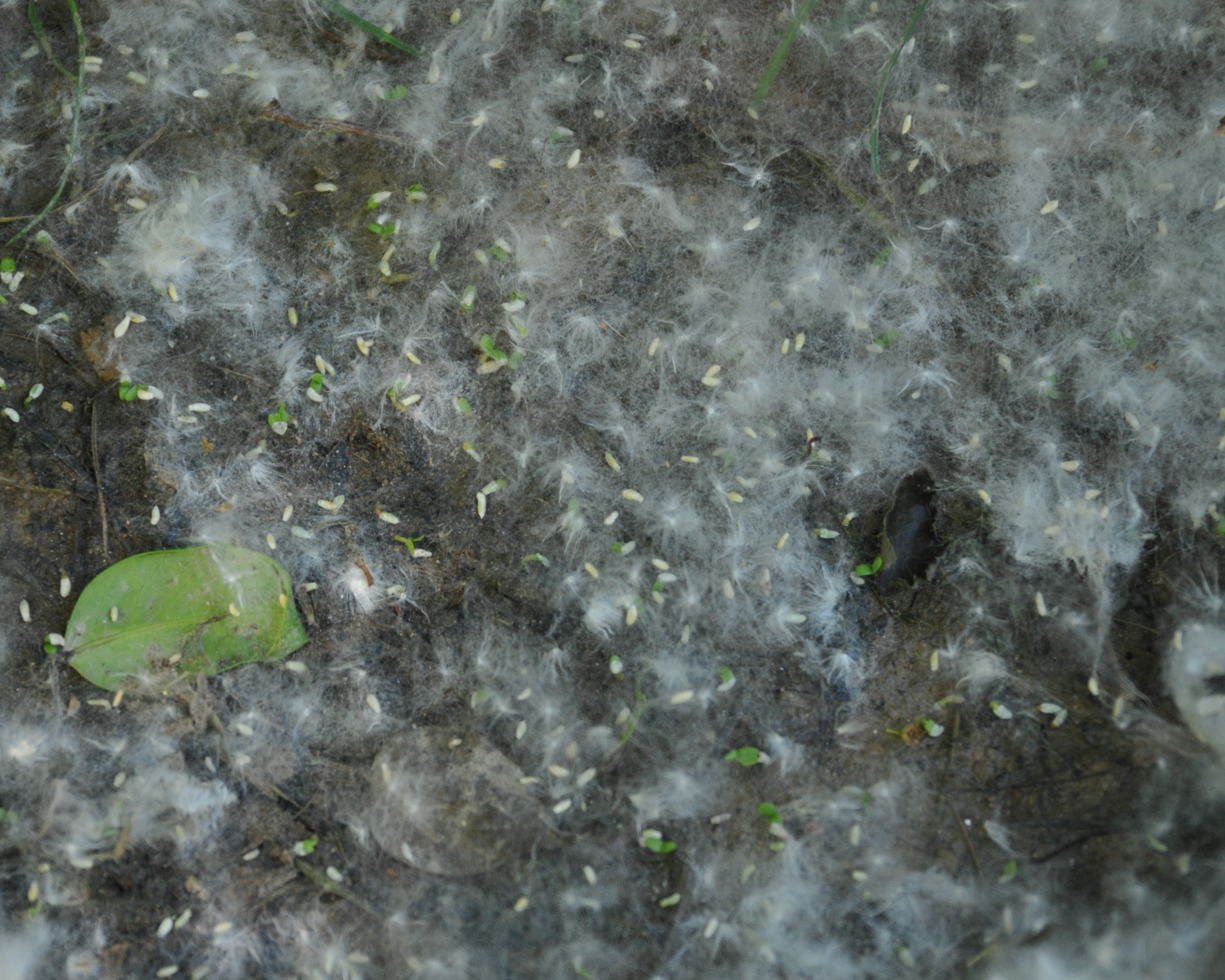
Seeds and seed hairs from an eastern cottonwood

=== Populus fremontii ===
Fremont's cottonwood (P. fremontii) is native to the southwestern United States and western Mexico. In the United States, the species can be found in Arizona, California, Colorado, Idaho, Nevada, New Mexico, Texas, and Utah. In Mexico, it can be found in the states of Baja California, Baja California Sur, Sonora, Chihuahua, Coahuila, Nuevo León, Mexico State, and Puebla. It differs from the eastern cottonwood mainly in the leaves having fewer, larger serrations on the edge, and small differences in the flower and seed pod structure. Some taxonomists formerly considered P. fremontii to be a subspecies of P. deltoides.

=== Populus nigra ===
Black poplar (P. nigra) is native to Europe and Western Asia, is distinct in its much smaller leaves, 5–11 cm (2.0–4.3 in) across, with a more rhombic (diamond) shape.

== Cultivation and uses ==
Cottonwoods are widely grown for timber production along wet river banks, where their exceptional growth rate provides a large crop of wood within just 10–30 years. The wood is coarse and of fairly low value, used for pallet boxes, shipping crates, and similar purposes where a cheap but strong enough wood is suitable. They are also widely grown as screens and shelterbelts. Many of the cottonwoods grown commercially are the hybrid of eastern cottonwood and black poplar, Populus × canadensis (hybrid black poplar or Carolina poplar).

Cottonwood bark is often a favorite medium for artisans. The bark, which is usually harvested in the fall after a tree's death, is generally very soft and easy to carve.

Cottonwood is one of the poorest wood fuels; it does not dry well, and rots quickly. It splits poorly, because it is very fibrous. It produces a low level of energy per unit of volume of wood.

Cottonwoods serve as food for the caterpillars of several Lepidoptera.
