= Cottonwood River (Dease River tributary) =

River in British Columbia, Canada

Coordinates: 59°05′00″N 129°42′00″W

The Cottonwood River is a tributary of the Dease River in the Cassiar Country of the Northern Interior of British Columbia, Canada. Rising in the northern Stikine Ranges just east of Toozaza Peak, and just south of the origins of the Jennings and Little Rancheria River near the border with Yukon, it flows south along the east flank of the Tuya Range to meet the Dease just north of that river's source at Dease Lake, between the north end of that lake and McDame Creek and the former mining centre and community of McDame Post.

== See also ==
- Tuya Mountains Provincial Park
- List of rivers of British Columbia
