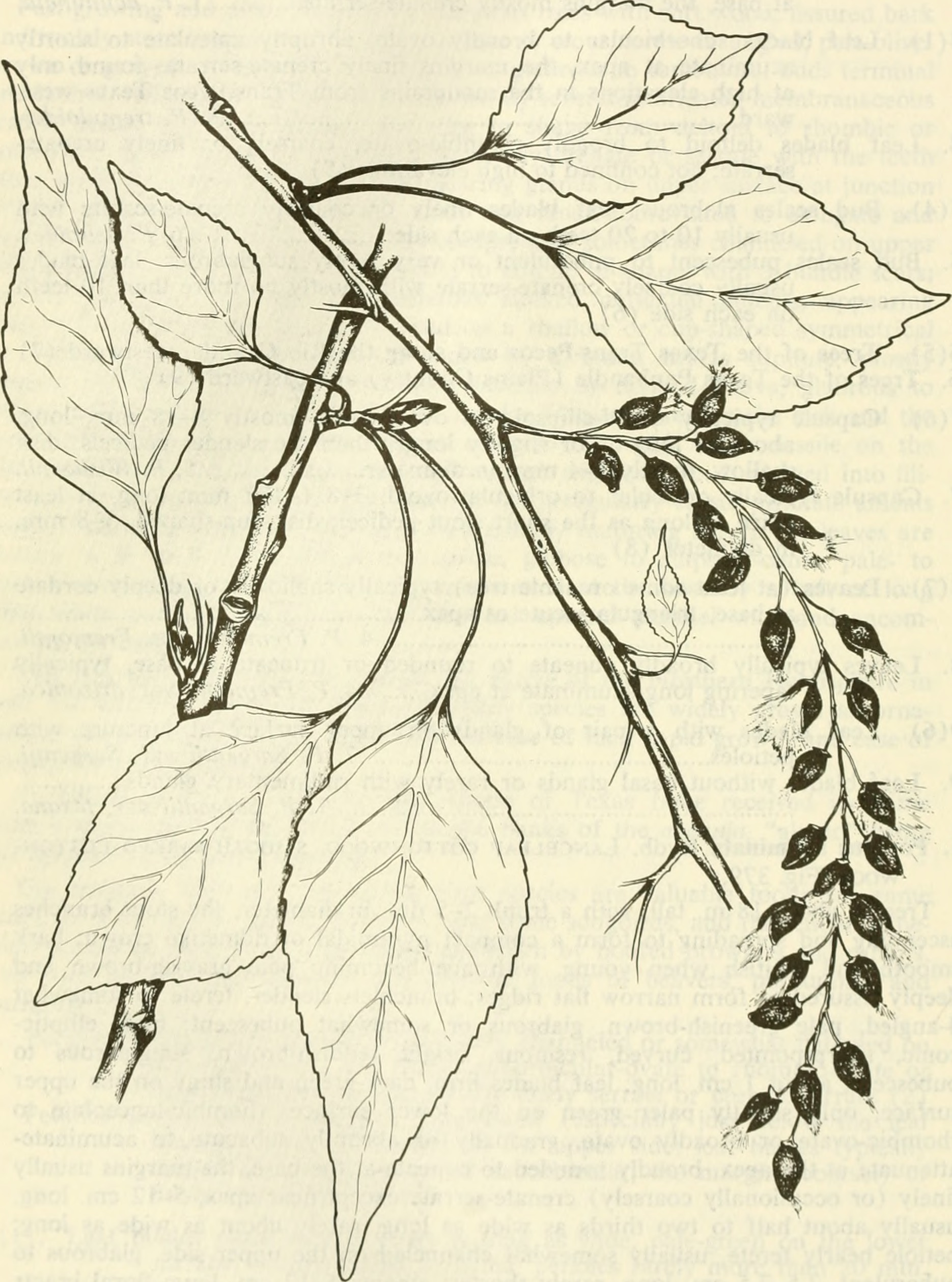
- Botanical illustration

Scientific classification
- Kingdom: Plantae
- Clade: Tracheophytes
- Clade: Angiosperms
- Clade: Eudicots
- Clade: Rosids
- Order: Malpighiales
- Family: Salicaceae
- Genus: Populus
- Species: P. × acuminata

Binomial name
- Populus × acuminata Rydb.

Synonyms
- Populus × hinckleyana Correll; Populus × intercurrens Goodrich & S.L. Welsh

= Populus × acuminata =

Species of flowering plant

Populus × acuminata or Populus acuminata, the lanceleaf cottonwood, is a species of Populus native to the Rocky Mountains of North America. It is a naturally occurring hybrid of narrowleaf cottonwood, Populus angustifolia, and eastern cottonwood, Populus deltoides, found where their ranges overlap. It is planted as a shade tree in cities in the Rockies, preferring to grow at elevations between 4,500 and 8,500 ft. Given the plant's proclivity (like other poplars) to send out shallow roots and suckers, some municipalities prohibit their planting. Fort Collins, Colorado, by contrast, has many lanceleaf cottonwoods gracing its avenues.
