= Pemphigus niishimae =

Scientific classification
- Kingdom: Animalia
- Phylum: Arthropoda
- Class: Insecta
- Order: Hemiptera
- Suborder: Sternorrhyncha
- Family: Aphididae
- Subfamily: Eriosomatinae
- Genus: Pemphigus
- Species: P. niishimae

Binomial name
- Pemphigus niishimae Kota Monzen, 1929

Species of aphid

Pemphigus niishimae is a species of gall-forming aphid, in the subgenus, Pemphigus, of the genus, Pemphigus. It was first described in 1929 by the Japanese entomologist, Kota Monzen.

It is found on the Korean Peninsula (and possibly elsewhere).
