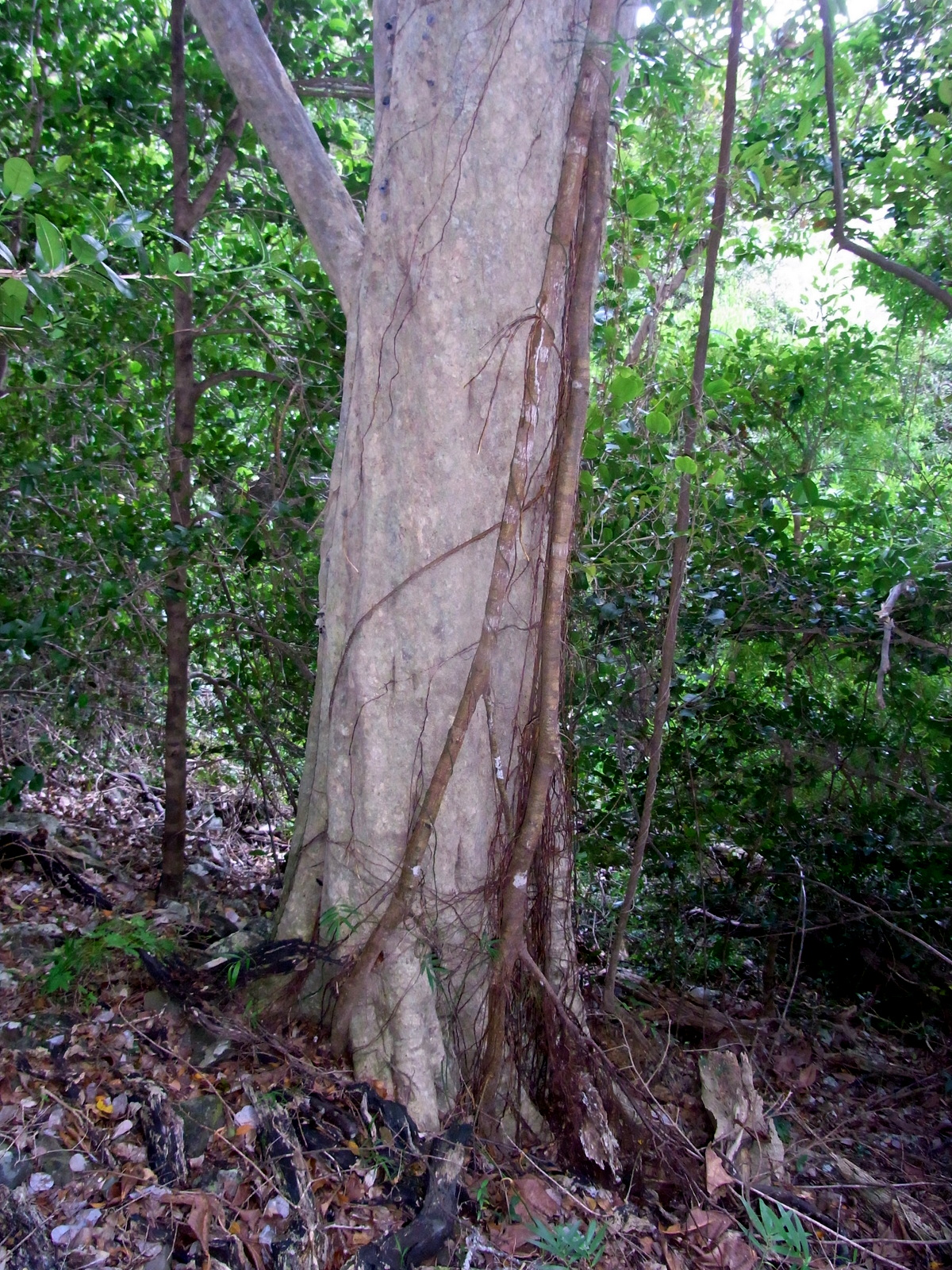

Scientific classification
- Kingdom: Plantae
- Clade: Embryophytes
- Clade: Tracheophytes
- Clade: Angiosperms
- Clade: Eudicots
- Clade: Rosids
- Order: Rosales
- Family: Cannabaceae
- Genus: Celtis
- Species: C. conferta
- Subspecies: C. c. subsp. amblyphylla

Trinomial name
- Celtis conferta subsp. amblyphylla (F.Muell.) P.S.Green, 1986

Synonyms
- Celtis amblyphylla F.Muell. 1875

= Celtis conferta subsp. amblyphylla =

Subspecies of flowering plant

Celtis conferta subsp. amblyphylla, commonly known as cotton wood or cotton-wood, is a flowering plant in the hemp and hackberry family.

== Description ==
C. c. subsp. amblyphylla is a tree with whitish bark growing to approximately 16 m (52 ft) in height. Its thick, leathery, oval leaves are 5–9 cm (2–3 1/2 in) long and 2–4 cm (3/4–1 5/8 in) wide. Clusters of small flowers, 3–4 mm (1/8–3/16 in) long, appear on the tree from November to February. The tree's round, purple fruits are about 4 mm (3/16 in) in diameter.

== Distribution and habitat ==
The subspecies is endemic to Australia's subtropical Lord Howe Island in the Tasman Sea, where it is widespread in lowland forest. The only other subspecies, C. c. subsp. conferta, is endemic to New Caledonia.
