= DIVA-GIS =

Geographic information system software program

- Stable release: 7.5
- Operating system: Cross-platform
- Type: Geographic information system
- License: GNU General Public License
- Website: www.diva-gis.org

DIVA-GIS is a free geographic information system software program used for the analysis of geographic data, especially species occurrence data. The software was first designed for application to the study of the distribution of plants, especially crop wild relatives such as wild potatoes.

== Development ==
DIVA-GIS was mainly developed by Robert Hijmans, Edwin Rojas, Marianna Cruz and Luigi Guarino. Its development was supported by the International Potato Center in Peru, the International Plant Genetic Resources Institute, the Museum of Vertebrate Zoology at the University of California at Berkeley, the Secretariat of the Pacific Community, and the FAO. DIVA-GIS has a wide range of tools for evaluation of mapping and modeling of habitats. There is a command-line version of the program that has been developed, AVID-GIS.

== Formats ==
DIVA-GIS can process data in standard GIS formats, including data from ESRI's ArcGIS programs. The program runs on Windows and OS X. DIVA raster files generated may be imported and exported into R or the modeling program Maxent.
