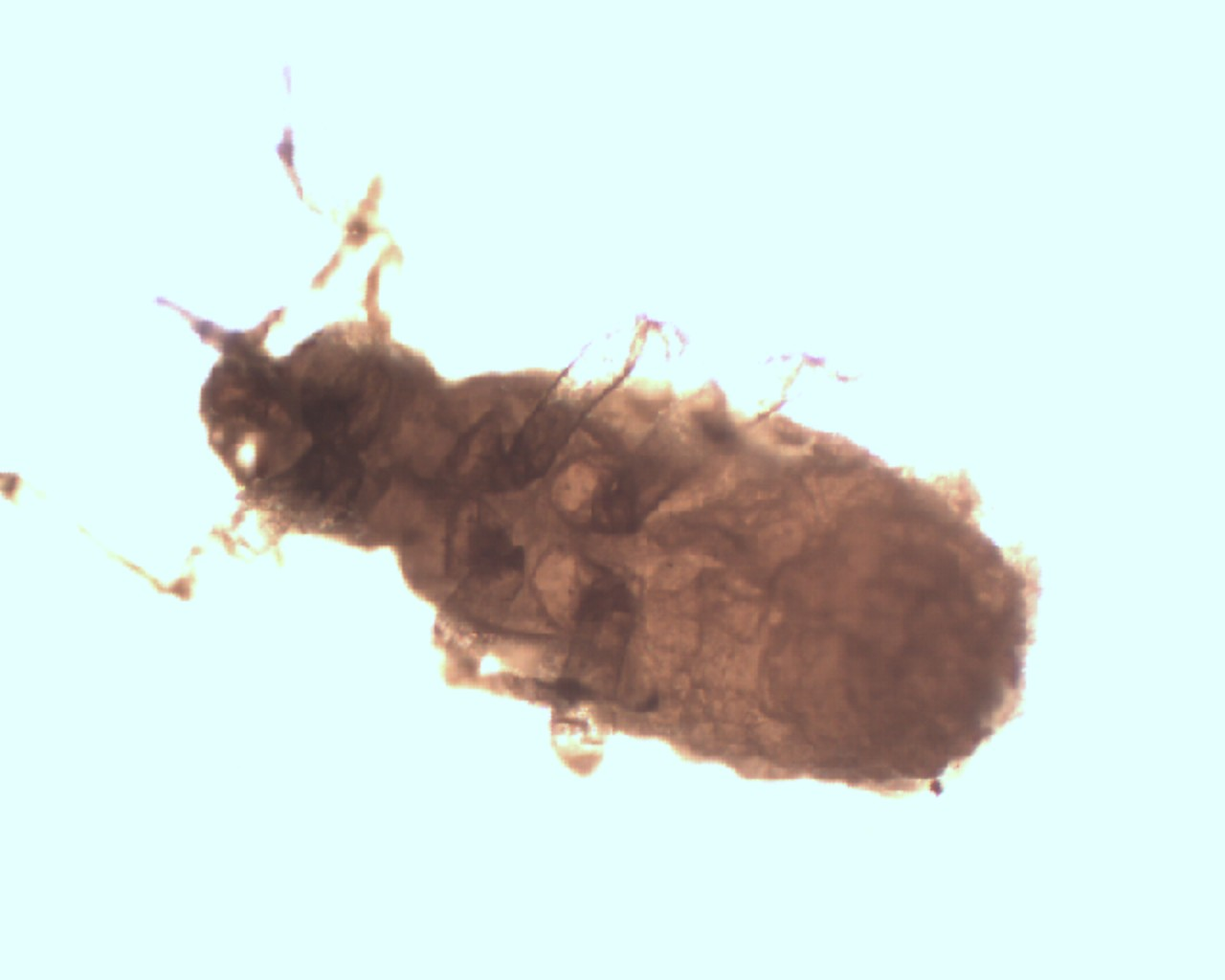
- Pemphigus spirothecae sexupara

Scientific classification
- Kingdom: Animalia
- Phylum: Arthropoda
- Class: Insecta
- Order: Hemiptera
- Suborder: Sternorrhyncha
- Family: Aphididae
- Subfamily: Eriosomatinae
- Genus: Pemphigus; Hartig, 1839

= Pemphigus (bug) =

Genus of insects

Pemphigus is a genus of true bugs belonging to the family Aphididae.

As of 2023, all aphids in this genus have been found to be gall-inducing.

The genus has almost cosmopolitan distribution.

Species:

- Pemphigus andropogiae Shinji, 1924
- Pemphigus betae Doane, 1900
- Pemphigus birimatus
- Pemphigus borealis Tullgren, 1909
- Pemphigus brevicornis (Hart, 1894)
- Pemphigus burrowi Sanborn, 1904
- Pemphigus bursarius (Linnaeus, 1758)
- Pemphigus bursifex Heer, 1853
- Pemphigus circellatus Zhang, Guangxue & Tiesen Zhong, 1985
- Pemphigus coluteae Passerini, 1863
- Pemphigus cylindricus Zhang & Guangxue, 1981
- Pemphigus diani Ferrari, 1872
- Pemphigus dorocola
- Pemphigus eastopi
- Pemphigus echnochloaphaga (Zhang, Guangxue, Qiao & Xiaolin Chen, 1999)
- Pemphigus ephemeratus Hottes & Frison, 1931
- Pemphigus fatauae Shinji, 1924
- Pemphigus formicarius Walsh, 1863
- Pemphigus formicetorum Walsh, 1863
- Pemphigus fuscicornis (C.L.Koch, 1857)
- Pemphigus gairi Stroyan, 1964
- Pemphigus groenlandicus Rübsaamen, 1898
- Pemphigus hydrophilus
- Pemphigus immunis Buckton, 1896
- Pemphigus indicus
- Pemphigus iskanderkuli Narzikulov, 1957
- Pemphigus knowltoni Stroyan, 1970
- Pemphigus laurifolia
- Pemphigus longicornus Maxson, 1923
- Pemphigus mangkamensis Zhang & Guangxue, 1981
- Pemphigus matsumurai Monzen, 1927
- Pemphigus microsetosus Aoki, 1975
- Pemphigus minor Derbès, 1869
- Pemphigus mongolicus Holman & Szelegiewicz, 1974
- Pemphigus monophagus Maxson, 1934
- Pemphigus mordvilkovi
- Pemphigus mordwilkoi Cholodkovsky, 1912
- Pemphigus nainitalensis Cholodkovsky, 1912
- Pemphigus napaeus Buckton, 1896
- Pemphigus niishimae
- Pemphigus nortonii Maxson, 1934
- Pemphigus obesinymphae Aoki & Moran, 1994
- Pemphigus passeki Börner, 1952
- Pemphigus phenax Börner & Blunk, 1916
- Pemphigus plicatus
- Pemphigus popularius Fitch, 1859
- Pemphigus populi Courchet, 1881
- Pemphigus populicaulis Fitch, 1859
- Pemphigus populiglobuli Fitch, 1859
- Pemphigus populinigrae (Schrank, 1801)
- Pemphigus populiramulorum C.V.Riley, 1879
- Pemphigus populitransversus C.V.Riley, 1879
- Pemphigus populivenae Fitch, 1859
- Pemphigus protospirae W.A.J.Lichstenstein, 1885
- Pemphigus rileyi Stebbins, 1910
- Pemphigus rubiradicis F.V.Theobald, 1929
- Pemphigus saccosus
- Pemphigus saliciradicis (Börner, 1950)
- Pemphigus salicis
- Pemphigus similis Börner, 1950
- Pemphigus sinobursarius Zhang & Guangxue, 1979
- Pemphigus siphunculatus Hille Ris Lambers, 1973
- Pemphigus spyrothecae
- Pemphigus tartareus Hottes & Frison, 1931
- Pemphigus tibetapolygoni Zhang & Guangxue, 1981
- Pemphigus tibetensis Zhang & Guangxue, 1979
- Pemphigus trehernei Foster, 1976
- Pemphigus turritus Zhang & Guangxue, 1997
- Pemphigus vesicarius Passerini, 1861
- Pemphigus wuduensis Zhang & Guangxue, 1997
- Pemphigus yanagi
- Pemphigus yangcola Zhang & Guangxue, 1979
