= Cottonwood Island (Washington) =

Coordinates: 46.0654°N 122.8748°W

Cottonwood Island is an uninhabited island in the U.S. state of Washington. It lies in the Columbia River between Kalama, Washington and the cities of Longview and Kelso, Washington further downstream. The island was named after a grove of cottonwood trees there.
