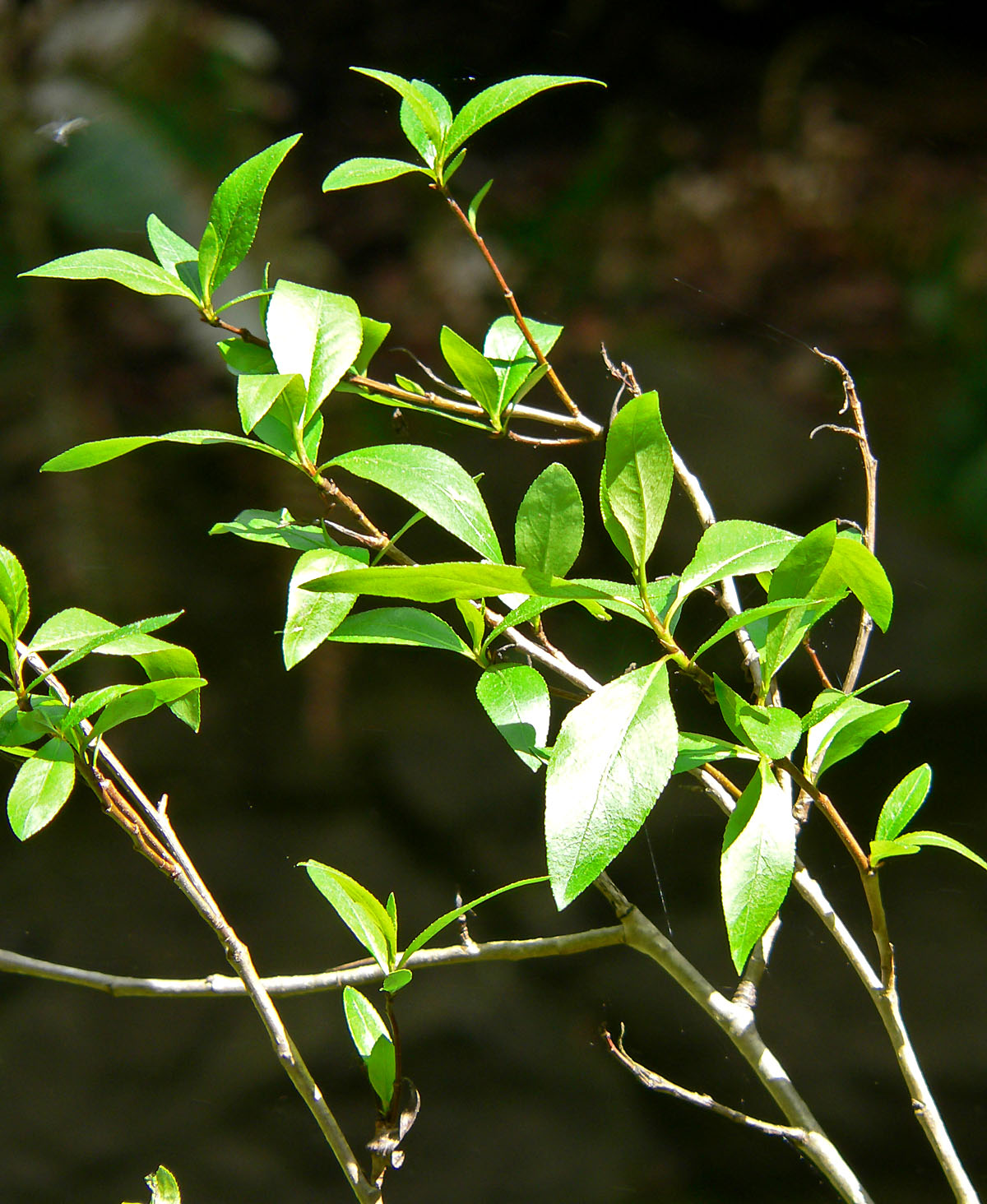

Conservation status
- Secure (NatureServe)

Scientific classification
- Kingdom: Plantae
- Clade: Tracheophytes
- Clade: Angiosperms
- Clade: Eudicots
- Clade: Rosids
- Order: Malpighiales
- Family: Salicaceae
- Genus: Populus
- Section: Populus sect. Tacamahaca
- Species: P. angustifolia

Binomial name
- Populus angustifolia E.James
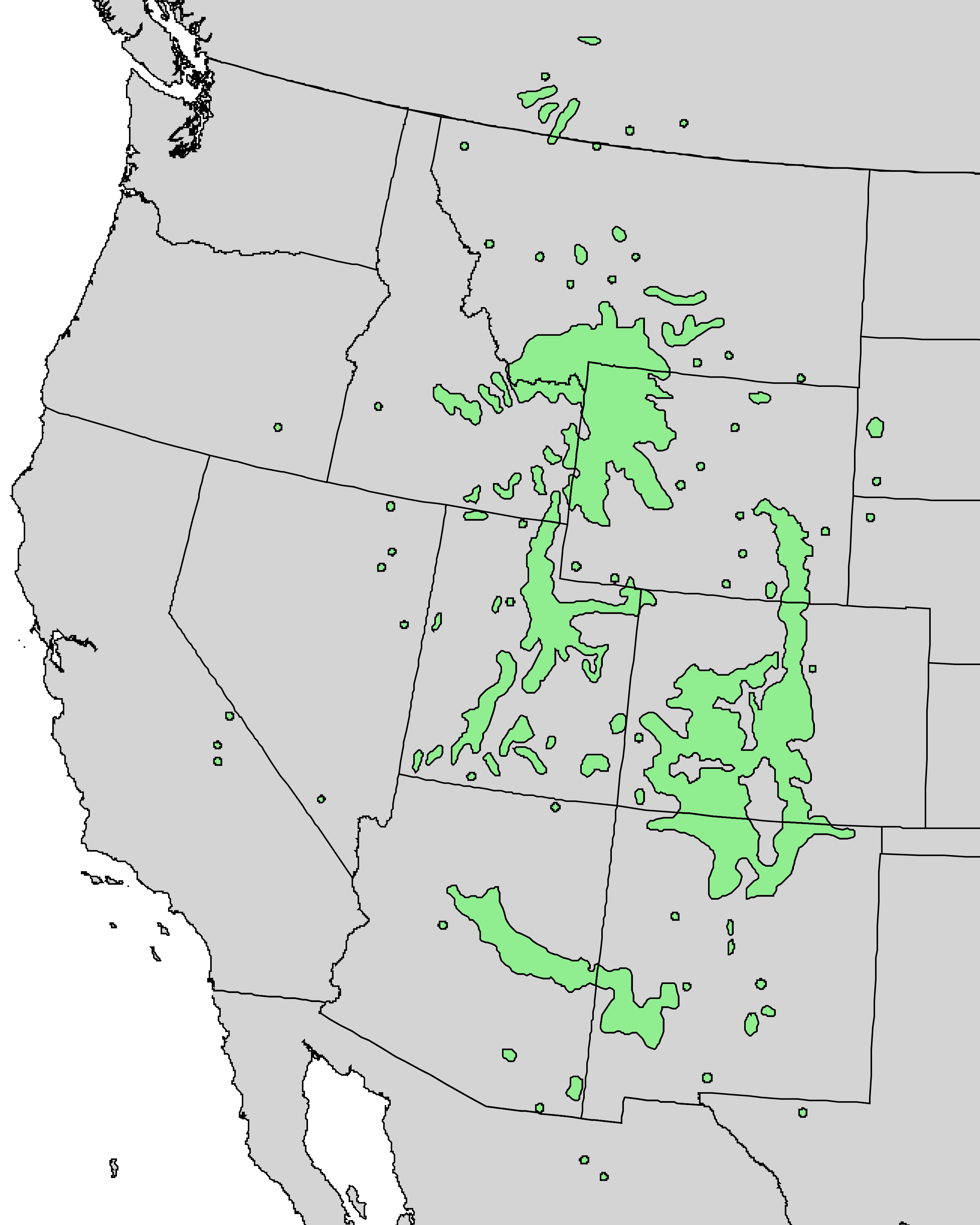
- Generalized natural range of Populus angustifolia

= Populus angustifolia =

Species of tree in the willow family

Populus angustifolia, commonly known as the narrowleaf cottonwood, is a species of tree in the willow family (Salicaceae). It is native to western North America, where it is a characteristic species of the Rocky Mountains and the surrounding plains. It ranges north to the provinces of Alberta and Saskatchewan in Canada and south to the states of Chihuahua, Coahuila, and Sonora in Mexico. Its natural habitat is by streams and creeks between 3,900 to 7,900 feet (1,200 to 2,400 m) elevation.

== Description ==
The tree is slim in profile, and can grow in tightly packed clusters. Its leaves are yellow-green, lanceolate (lance-shaped), and with scalloped margins. It produces catkins in the early spring. The fruiting capsules are fluffy and white.

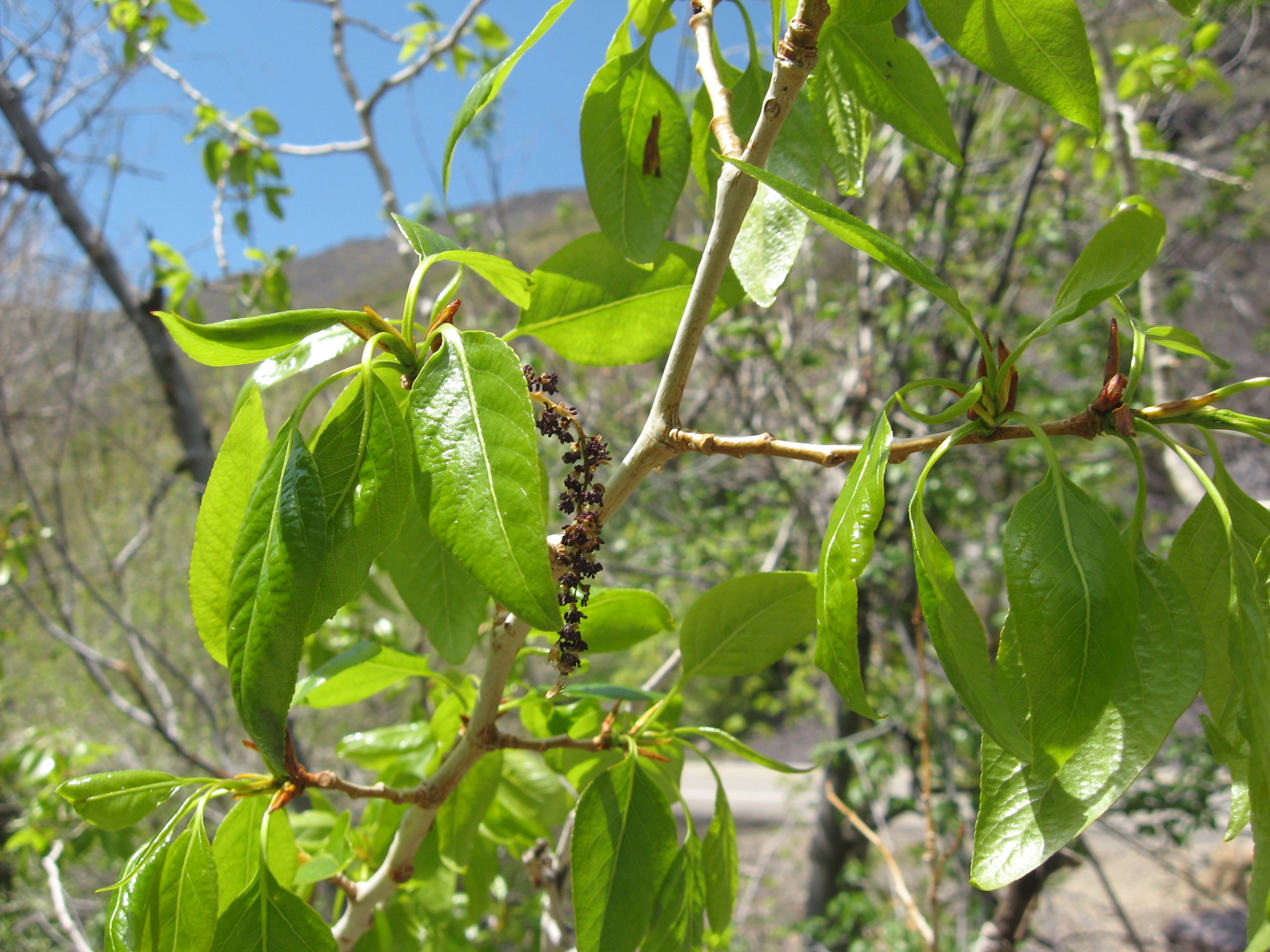
Old catkins and emerging spring leaves

== Taxonomy ==
Where their ranges come into contact, this species will readily hybridize with Populus balsamifera, Populus deltoides, Populus fremontii, and Populus trichocarpa. These hybrids can form extensive populations in some regions. Due to the frequency and morphological consistency of P. angustifolia × P. deltoides hybrids, they were initially described as a fully separate species ("P. acuminata") until its hybrid origin was firmly established in the 1980s.

== Range ==
Narrowleaf cottonwoods grow in western North America from southern Canada to northern Mexico. In Canada the species grows in just Alberta and Saskatchewan. Southwards in the United States it is wide ranging from the Pacific Northwest to the Southwestern US. It grows as far east as South Dakota, Nebraska, Colorado, New Mexico, and Texas. In Mexico it is only found in three states, Chihuahua, Coahuila and Sonora.

== Uses ==
The buds are sticky and gummy and were enjoyed as a sort of chewing gum by local Native American peoples, including the Apache and Navajo. The tree is the host species of the sugarbeet root aphid (Pemphigus betae).
