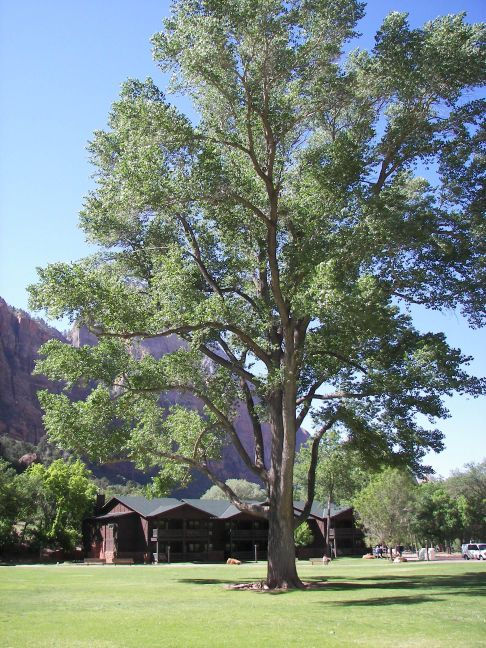
- Frémont's Cottonwood at Zion Lodge, Zion National Park, Utah

Scientific classification
- Kingdom: Plantae
- Clade: Tracheophytes
- Clade: Angiosperms
- Clade: Eudicots
- Clade: Rosids
- Order: Malpighiales
- Family: Salicaceae
- Genus: Populus
- Section: Populus sect. Aigeiros
- Species: P. fremontii

Binomial name
- Populus fremontii S. Watson
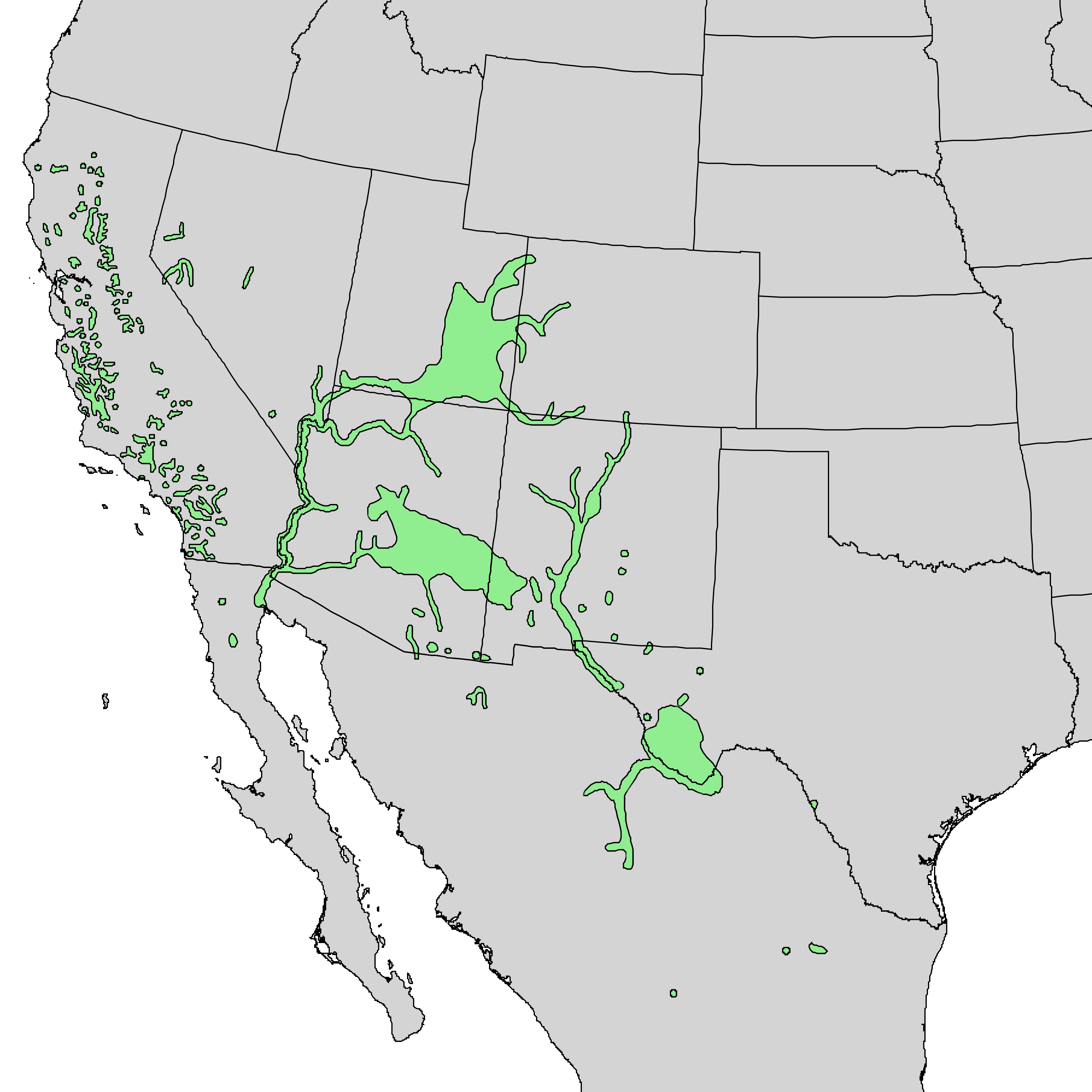
- Natural range of P. fremontii

= Populus fremontii =

Frémont's cottonwood

Species of tree

Populus fremontii, commonly known as Frémont's cottonwood, is a cottonwood native to riparian zones of the Southwestern United States and northern through central Mexico. It is one of three species in Populus sect. Aigeiros. The tree was named after 19th-century American explorer and pathfinder John C. Frémont.

== Description ==
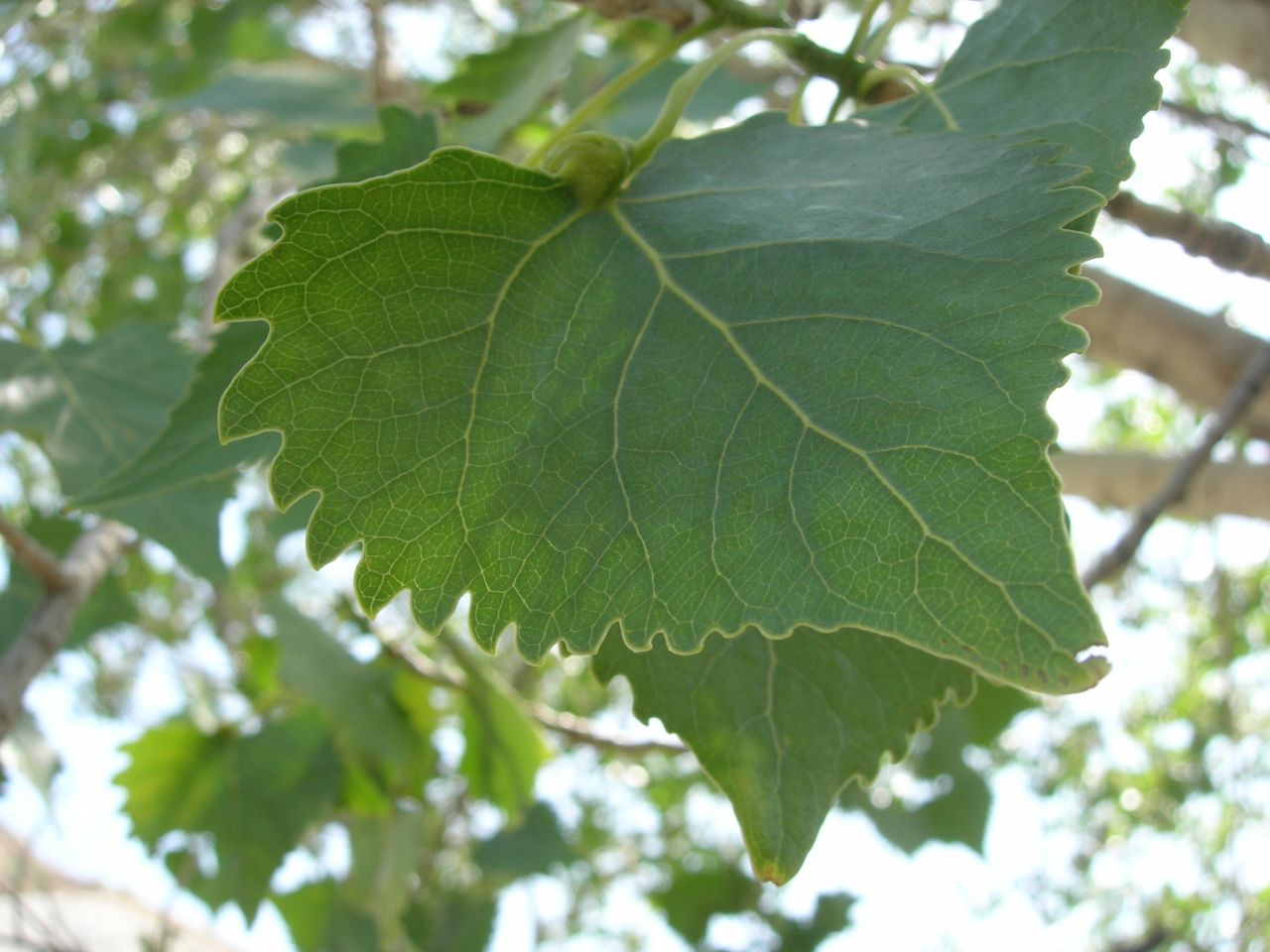
Leaf: Populus fremontii ssp. fremontii

P. fremontii is a large tree growing from 12–35 m (39–115 ft) in height with a wide crown, with a trunk up to 1.5 m (4 ft 11 in) in diameter. The bark is smooth when young, becoming deeply fissured with whitish, cracked bark on old trees.

The 3–7 cm (1.2–2.8 in) long leaves, are cordate (heart-shaped) with an elongated tip, with white veins and coarse crenate teeth along the sides, glabrous to hairy, and often stained with milky resin. Autumn colors occur from October–November, mainly a bright yellow, also orange, rarely red.

The inflorescence consists of a long, drooping catkin, which blooms from March to April. The fruit is a wind-dispersed achene, that appears to look like patches of cotton hanging from limbs, thus the name cottonwood.

The largest known P. fremontii tree in the United States grows in Skull Valley, Arizona. In 2012, it had a measured circumference of 557 in (14,100 mm), height of 102 ft (31 m), and a spread of 149.5 ft (45.6 m).

=== Subspecies or varieties ===
Two subspecies are currently recognized. Some confusion due to hybridization with a Rio Grande subspecies of Populus deltoides subsp. wislizeni had originally placed this eastern cottonwood subspecies as a P. fremontii subspecies, but it was removed in 1977.

- P. f. subsp. fremontii, with synonyms P. f. var. arizonica - Sarg. and P. f. var. macdougalii - (Rose) Jeps. from California and west of the Continental Divide
- P. f. subsp. mesetae - Eckenwal., of arid areas of Mexico and west Texas, and widely planted elsewhere, generally east of the Continental Divide

== Distribution ==
The tree is native to the Southwestern United States and Mexico. In the northwestern US it is found only in the state of Idaho, but it is widespread in every state of the southwestern United States including California, Nevada, Utah, and Arizona. It is also native to a few locations in western Colorado as well as disjunct parts of New Mexico and far western Texas.

In northwestern Mexico it is native to the states of Baja California, Baja California Sur, and Sonora. In the northeast it is found in Chihuahua, Coahuila, Durango, and Nuevo León and in just Mexico State and Puebla in central Mexico.

A riparian tree, it grows near streams, rivers, springs, seeps, wetlands, and well-watered alluvial bottomlands at elevations below 2,000 metres (6,600 ft) elevation.

== Uses ==
=== Cultivation ===
P. fremontii is cultivated as an ornamental tree and riparian zone restoration tree. It is used in planting for wildlife food and shelter habitats, and ecological restoration, larger native plant and wildlife gardens, and natural landscaping projects, windbreaks, erosion control, and shade for recreation facilities, parks, and livestock.

Frémont's cottonwood was used in the past by settlers and ranchers for fuel and fence posts.

=== Native Americans ===
Traditional medicine

Native Americans in the Western United States and Mexico traditionally use parts of Frémont's cottonwood variously for a medicine, in basket weaving, for tool making, and for musical instruments. The inner bark of Frémont's cottonwood contains vitamin C and was chewed as an antiscorbutic - treatment for vitamin C deficiency. The bark and leaves could be used to make poultices to reduce inflammation or to treat wounds.

Art

The Akimel Oʼodham of southern Arizona and northern Mexico live along Sonoran Desert watercourses and traditionally used twigs from the tree in the fine and intricate baskets they wove. The Cahuilla people of southern California used the tree's wood for tool making, the Pueblo peoples for drums, and the Lower Colorado River Quechan people in ritual cremations. The Hopi of Northeastern Arizona carve the root of the cottonwood to create kachina dolls.

== See also ==
- California native plants
- Riparian buffer
- Riparian forest
