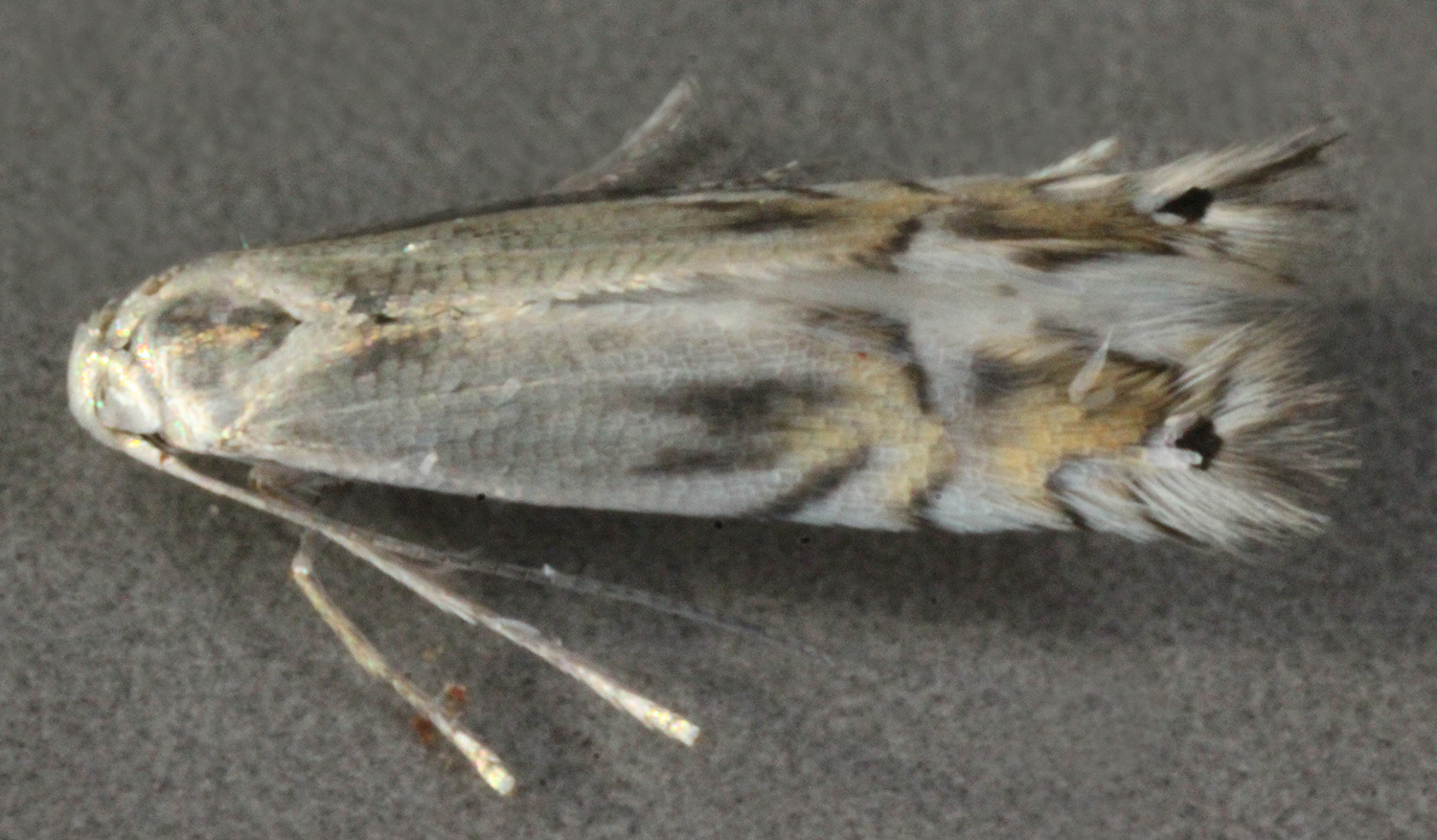
- Phyllocnistis unipunctella, Deeside, North Wales.

Scientific classification
- Domain: Eukaryota
- Kingdom: Animalia
- Phylum: Arthropoda
- Class: Insecta
- Order: Lepidoptera
- Family: Gracillariidae
- Genus: Phyllocnistis
- Species: P. unipunctella

Binomial name
- Phyllocnistis unipunctella (Stephens, 1834)

Synonyms
- Argyromiges unipunctella Stephens, 1834; Opostega suffusella Zeller, 1847

= Phyllocnistis unipunctella =

Species of moth

Phyllocnistis unipunctella is a moth of the family Gracillariidae. It is known from all of Europe.

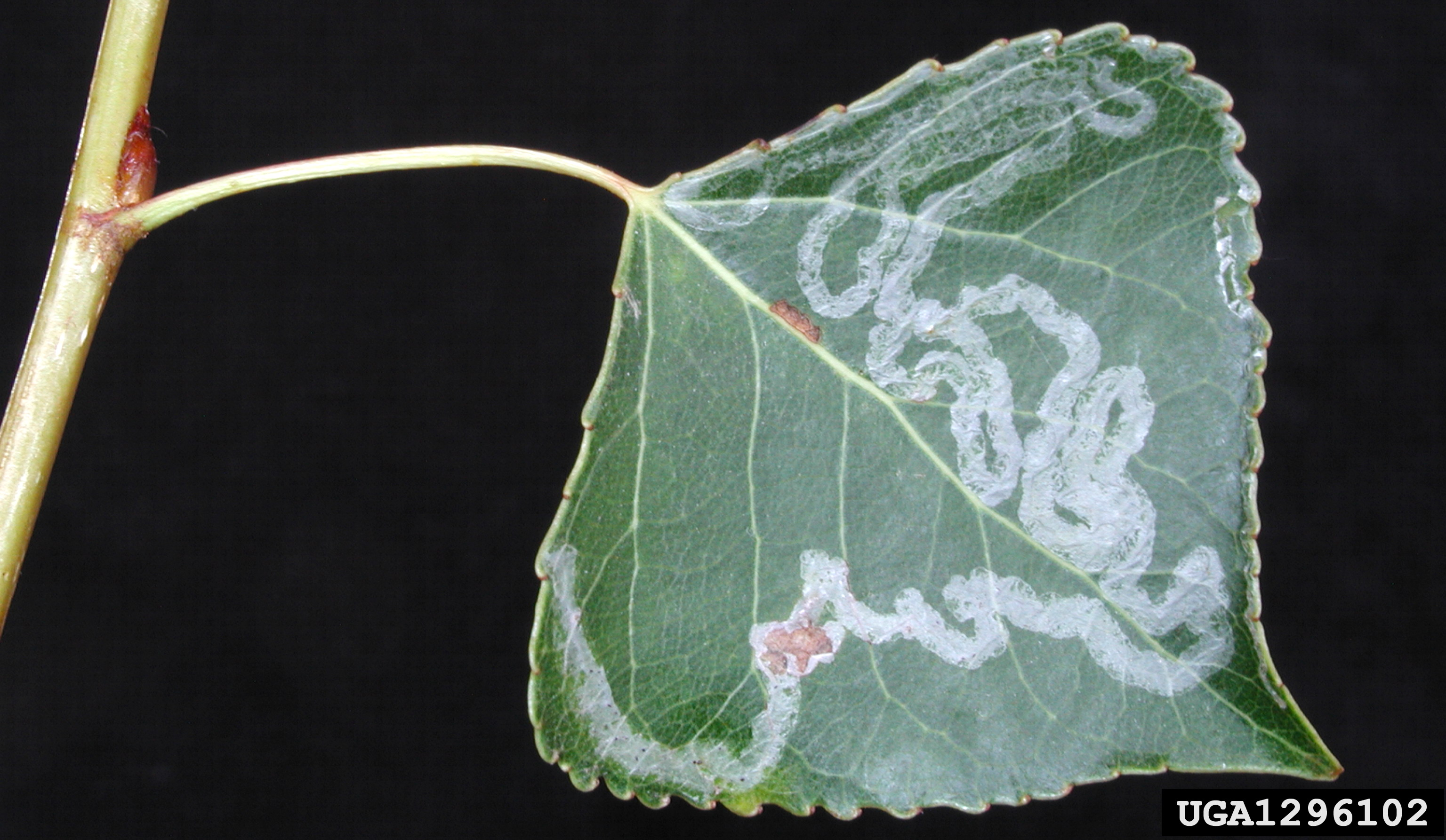
Damage

The wingspan is 7–8 mm. A whitish moth with yellowish suffusion and a distinct black spot near the wing apex. The forewings are shining white, posteriorly more or less ochreous-tinged; often a suffused spot on dorsum near base and a larger one in middle of disc dark fuscous; a transverse dark fuscous line at 2/3, preceded by one and followed by two dark fuscous streaks from costa; a round black apical dot; three dark fuscous diverging bars in apical cilia. Hindwings are light grey. The larva is pale green.

Adults are on wing in July and from September onwards, sometimes overwintering in haystacks.

The larvae feed on Populus balsmifera, Populus x canadensis, Populus candicans, Populus deltoides, Populus euphratica, Populus gileadensis, Populus nigra, Populus simonii, Populus suaveolens and Populus trichocarpa. They mine the leaves of their host plant.
