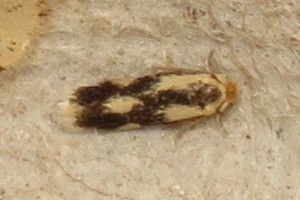

Scientific classification
- Kingdom: Animalia
- Phylum: Arthropoda
- Clade: Pancrustacea
- Class: Insecta
- Order: Lepidoptera
- Family: Nepticulidae
- Genus: Stigmella
- Species: S. trimaculella

Binomial name
- Stigmella trimaculella (Haworth, 1828)

Synonyms
- Tinea trimaculella Haworth, 1828; Nepticula albicornella Kollar in Nowicki, 1860; Nepticula gilvella Rossler, 1866; Nepticula populella Herrich-Schaffer, 1855; Nepticula populicola Sorhagen, 1922; Nepticula rufella Zeller, 1849; Stigmella subtrimaculella Dufrane, 1949

= Stigmella trimaculella =

Species of moth

Stigmella trimaculella is a moth of the family Nepticulidae. It is found in most of Europe, east to the eastern part of Palearctic realm.

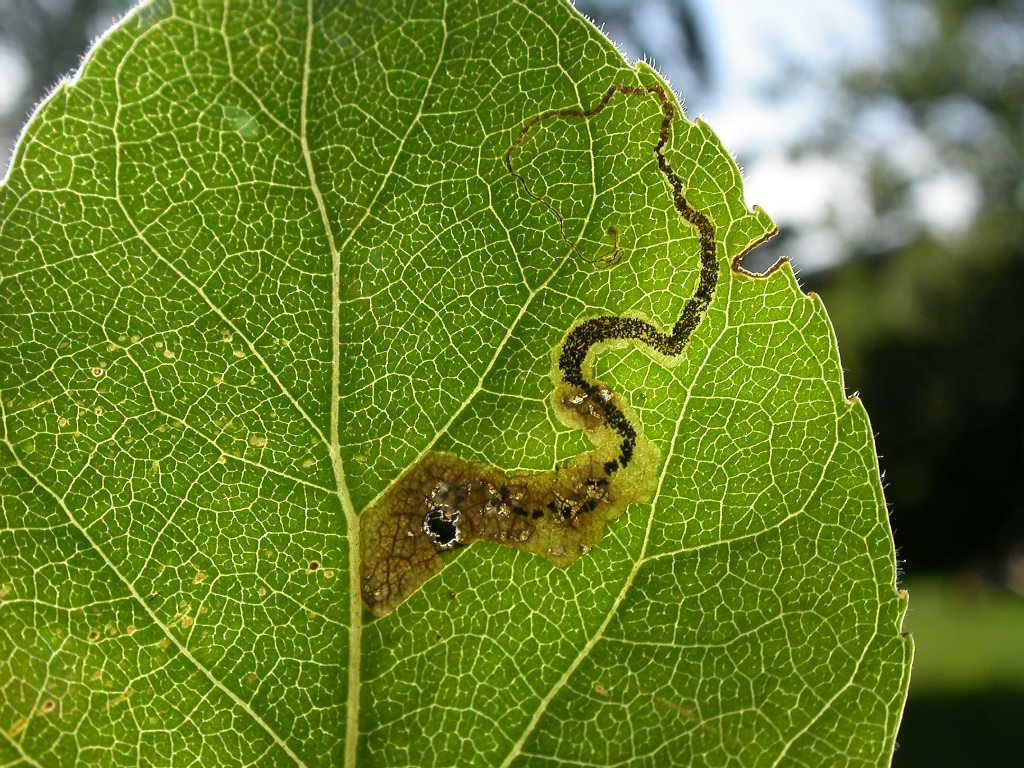
Stigmella trimaculella mine

The wingspan is 5–6 millimetres (0.20–0.24 in). The thick erect hairs on the head vertex are ochreous-yellowish. The collar is white. Antennal eyecaps are whitish. The forewings are dark fuscous; a broad median longitudinal patch extending from base to near middle, and large opposite sometimes confluent triangular costal and dorsal spots beyond middle whitish-yellowish. Hindwings are grey. Abdomen of male yellowish, crimson-tinged. External image

Adults are on wing in May and again in August.

The larvae feed on Populus alba, Populus angustifolia, Populus x canadensis, Populus candicans, Populus canescens, Populus deltoides, Populus nigra, Populus simonii, Populus suaveolens, Populus tremula and Populus trichocarpa. They mine the leaves of their host plant.
