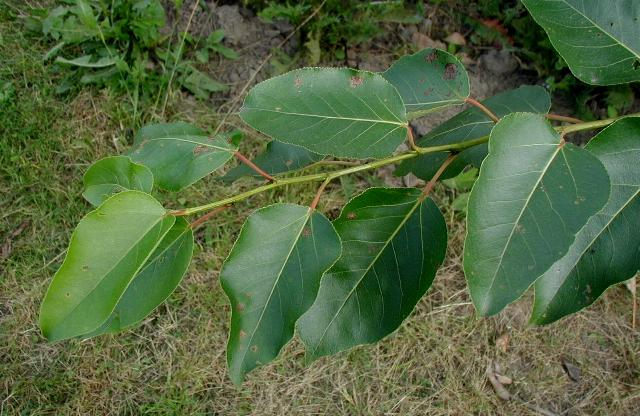
- Western balsam poplar (Populus trichocarpa)

Scientific classification
- Kingdom: Plantae
- Clade: Tracheophytes
- Clade: Angiosperms
- Clade: Eudicots
- Clade: Rosids
- Order: Malpighiales
- Family: Salicaceae
- Genus: Populus
- Section: Populus sect. Tacamahaca; Spach

Species
- Populus angustifolia; Populus balsamifera; Populus cathayana Rehder; Populus ciliata Wall. ex Royle; Populus koreana Rehder; Populus laurifolia Ledeb.; Populus maximowiczii A.Henry; Populus simonii Carr.; Populus szechuanica Schneid.; Populus trichocarpa; Populus ussuriensis Komarov (but see text); Populus yunnanensis Dode; Populus × jackii Sarg.; and see text

= Populus sect. Tacamahaca =

Group of poplars

The balsam poplars (Populus sect. Tacamahaca) are a group of about 10 species of poplars, indigenous to North America and eastern Asia, distinguished by the balsam scent of their buds, the whitish undersides of their leaves, and the leaf petiole being round (not flattened) in cross-section. They are large deciduous trees, 30–60 m tall, with leaves with a rounded base, pointed apex, and a whitish waxy coating on the underside of the leaf; this latter distinguishes them from most other poplars. The name is derived from the pleasant balsam smell of the opening buds and leaves in spring, produced by a sticky gum on the buds which also helps protect the buds from insect damage. The balsam poplars are light-demanding trees that require considerable moisture. Balsam poplars are tolerant of very cold conditions, occurring further north than other poplars except for the aspens. The poplars in Southern California are tolerant of 100 plus degree heat. They grow along dry washes and dry riverbeds. The dry washes and dry riverbeds will have flowing water when it rains sufficiently. Their leaves hang down and are at an edge to the sun. This may be another factor why they can take the high heat. Their leaves tremble in the slightest breeze like the quaking aspen

== Species ==
The balsam poplar P. balsamifera (= P. tacamahaca, P. candicans) is a native of North America, where it grows on alluvial bottomlands in the northeastern United States and Canada. It grows to a height of 30 metres and has yellow-grey bark, thick and furrowed, and coloured blackish at the base of the trunk. The twigs are yellow-brown to brown, the buds covered with a layer of balsam resin. The flowers and fruit are very much like those of the white poplar (P. alba) which is a relative of the aspens (Populus sect. Populus).

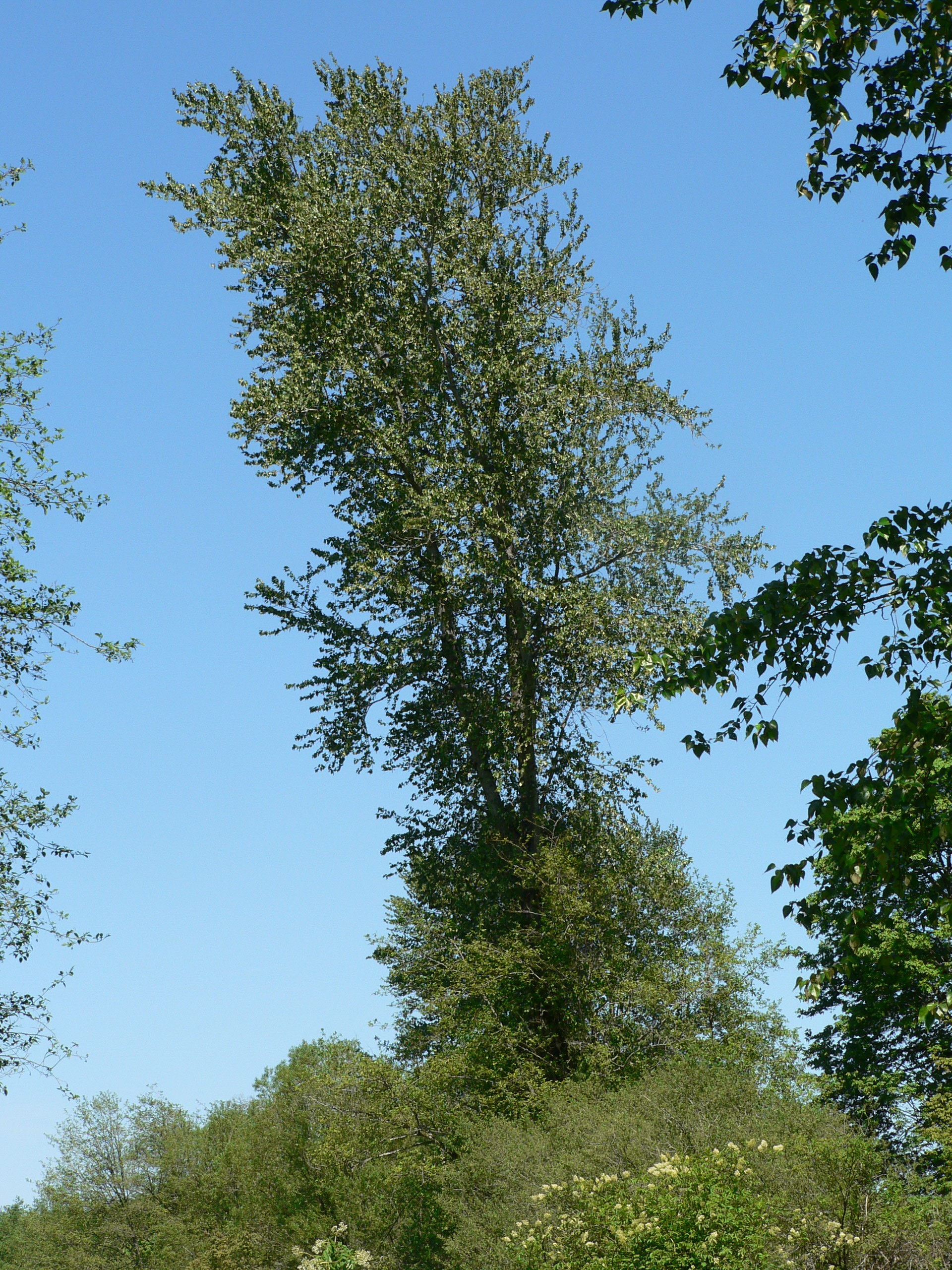
Large western balsam poplar

The western balsam poplar, black cottonwood, or California poplar P. trichocarpa is native to western North America, from Alaska south to northern California. It is the largest species of poplar, recorded to 65 m tall. It is also a very important species in plant biology. It was announced on 15 September 2006 in the journal Science that P. trichocarpa became the first tree species to have its entire genome sequenced. In the mountains of interior western North America, it is replaced by the willow-leaved poplar or narrowleaf cottonwood, P. angustifolia. P. trichocarpa is sometimes treated within P. balsamifera as P. balsamifera ssp. trichocarpa.

Simon's poplar (P. simonii), a native of northwestern China, is frequently planted as a shade tree in northern European cities. It is an attractive ornamental tree with whitish bark, and nearly rhombic, 6–10 cm long leaves which appear on the tree in early spring. Maximowicz' poplar or Japanese poplar (P. maximowiczii) and the Ussuri poplar (P. ussuriensis = P. maximowiczii var. barbinervis) are similar, occurring in northeastern China, Japan, Korea, and eastern Siberia; they have broader leaves. Another similar species is the laurel-leaf poplar (P. laurifolia from Mongolia), which differs from its relatives in narrower leaves shaped like a bay laurel leaf. Another putative member of this group is the Korean poplar (P. koreana).

Whether the northeast Asian Sichuan poplar (P. szechuanica) and P. tristis belong here or with the aspens is not yet resolved. Likewise, the affiliation of P. cathayana and the Yunnan poplar (P. yunnanensis) are in need of further study, though these may well be balsam poplars.

There are other species not listed here. How to classify Populus into species, at least for Chinese populations, is not yet settled.

== Use by humans ==
Balsam poplars are cultivated mainly in parks for their ornamental, light-coloured bark and pleasant scent in spring. Western balsam poplar is also planted as a timber crop. The wood is soft, very light in weight, but strong for its weight, coarse and fibrous, does not polish or plane easily, and is used for pallet boxes and other similar rough uses.

Several hybrids between balsam poplars (particularly western balsam poplar) and the cottonwoods have also been developed for lumber production or for use as shade trees. These hybrids are selected for exceptionally fast growth and disease resistance.

Poplars are also of potential use for biofuels because of their fast growth. Researchers are aiming to use genetic techniques to make poplars grow fatter, with a smaller canopy, so that more trees can be grown more quickly in a small space, and to make the plants contain a higher proportion of cellulose to lignin. The increased cellulose content would make them easier to convert into sugars and ethanol for biofuel or for pulp in paper mills.

The buds of various balsam poplars have long been combined with a lard base to make the vulnerary ointment Balm of Gilead.

== See also ==
- Balm of Gilead
- Protium heptaphyllum, South-American tacamahaca.
