= Dogtrot Lake (Minnesota) =

Lake in the state of Minnesota, United States

- Location within Minnesota
- Location: Cook County, Minnesota, US
- Coordinates: 47°47′36″N 90°45′41″W
- Primary outflows: Poplar River
- Basin countries: United States
- Surface area: 15 acres (0 km^{2})

Dogtrot Lake is a 15-acre lake in Cook County, Minnesota which is a tributary to the Poplar River. Dogtrot Lake reaches a maximum depth of 24 feet in a depression just south of the mouth of the stream leading to Slip Lake. Dogtrot lake is accessible through portages to Bulge Lake and Slip Lake. A fisheries survey turned up populations of walleye, northern pike, yellow perch, and white suckers.
