= Manymoon Lake (Minnesota) =

Lake in the state of Minnesota, United States

- Location within Minnesota Location within the United States
- Location: Cook County, Minnesota, United States
- Coordinates: 47°46′31″N 90°46′45″W
- Primary outflows: Rice Lake, Poplar River
- Basin countries: United States
- Surface area: 24 acres (0 km^{2})
- Max. depth: 6.5 ft (2 m)

Manymoon Lake is a 24-acre lake in Cook County, Minnesota belonging to the Poplar River watershed. At its deepest point it measures only 6.5 feet deep and has abundant aquatic plant life to a depth of 2.5 feet. Water clarity as of 2008 measured 1.41 meters. The substrate consists of muck and stones of no uniform size. Manymoon lake has neither inlet nor permanent outlet, although an intermittent stream feeds a wetland on the end of the southeastern bay. Nonetheless, Manymoon is located in the sub-watershed dominated by Rice Lake to the north, and water from Manymoon enters into lower portions of the Poplar River through Rice Lake's outflow. Manymoon is accessible through a portage off Rice Lake Road.

Manymoon Lake is a fishless lake. No fish of any kind turned up during the most recent survey in 2003. The state DNR has no interest in stocking the lake or using it as a rearing pond due to its insufficient size and difficulty of access.
