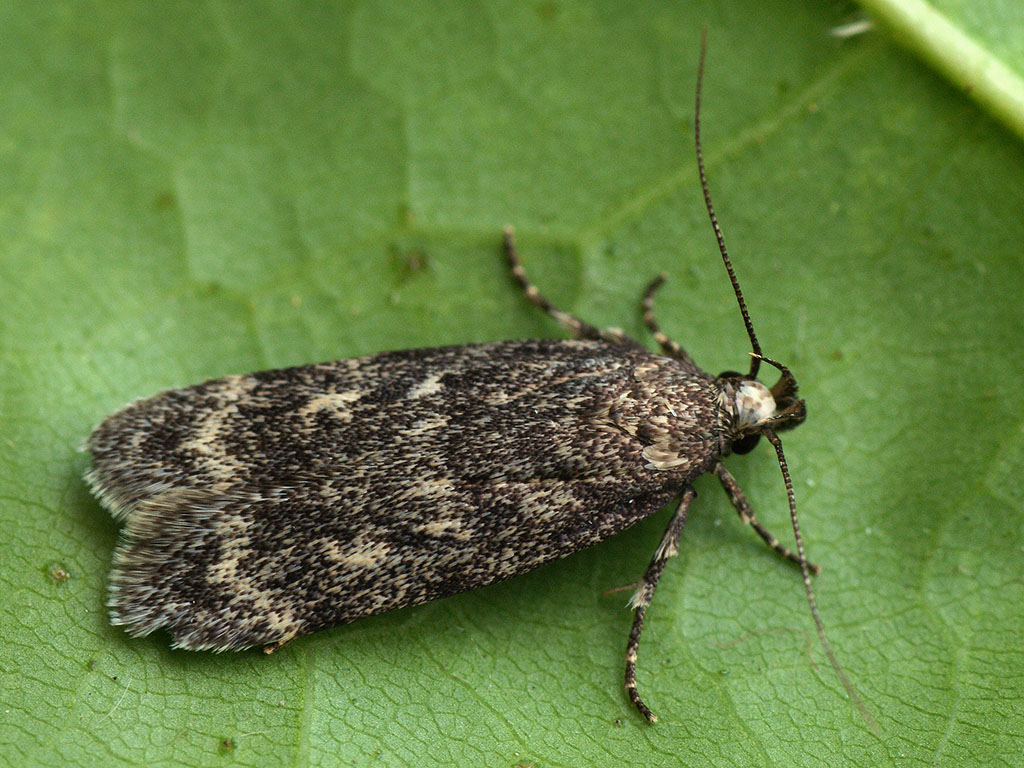

Scientific classification
- Kingdom: Animalia
- Phylum: Arthropoda
- Clade: Pancrustacea
- Class: Insecta
- Order: Lepidoptera
- Family: Gelechiidae
- Genus: Gelechia
- Species: G. turpella

Binomial name
- Gelechia turpella (Denis & Schiffermüller, 1775)

Synonyms
- Tinea turpella Denis & Schiffermüller, 1775; Haemylis pinguinella Treitschke, 1832; Gelechia pinquinella; Tinea populella Hübner, 1796; Recurvaria nebulea Haworth, 1827; Anarsia kochiella Herrich-Schäffer, 1854

= Gelechia turpella =

Species of moth

Gelechia turpella, the grand groundling, is a moth of the family Gelechiidae. It is widely distributed in Europe. Outside of Europe, it is found from the Caucasus to Siberia and the Russian Far East. The habitat consists of woodlands and parks.

The wingspan is 16–22 mm. Adults are on wing from mid-June to early September.

The larvae feed on Populus nigra (including Populus nigra f. italica), Populus pyramidalis, Populus balsamifera and Populus laurifolia. They live living within a spun or rolled leaf of their host plant.
