= Tack Lake (Minnesota) =

Lake in the state of Minnesota, United States

- Location within Minnesota Location within the United States
- Location: Cook County, Minnesota, United States
- Coordinates: 47°47′16″N 90°46′21″W
- Primary outflows: Poplar River
- Basin countries: United States
- Surface area: 16 acres (0 km^{2})

Tack Lake is a 16-acre lake in Cook County, Minnesota which is a tributary to the Poplar River through Rice Lake. Water clarity surveys performed by the University of Minnesota indicated Tack Lake had a visibility of 2.48 meters in 2008.
