= Bulge Lake (Minnesota) =

Lake in the state of Minnesota, United States

- Location within Minnesota Location within the United States
- Location: Cook County, Minnesota, U.S.
- Coordinates: 47°47′27″N 90°45′47″W
- Primary outflows: Poplar River
- Basin countries: United States
- Surface area: 12 acres (0 km^{2})

Bulge Lake is a 12-acre lake in Cook County, Minnesota which is a tributary to the Poplar River. Bulge Lake reaches a maximum depth of 19 feet in a sudden depression just west of the mouth of the stream leading to Dogtrot Lake. Bulge lake is accessible through portages to Silver Lake and Dogtrot Lake. A fisheries survey turned up populations of walleye, northern pike, yellow perch, and white suckers.
