= Slip Lake (Minnesota) =

Lake in the state of Minnesota, United States

- Location within Minnesota Location within the United States
- Location: Cook County, Minnesota, US
- Coordinates: 47°47′47″N 90°45′39″W
- Primary outflows: Poplar River
- Basin countries: United States
- Surface area: 22 acres (0 km^{2})

Slip Lake is a 22-acre lake in Cook County, Minnesota which is a tributary to the Poplar River. Slip Lake reaches a maximum depth of 18 feet in a depression just south of the mouth of the stream leading to Fleck Lake. Slip Lake is accessible through portages to Dogtrot Lake and Fleck Lake. A fisheries survey turned up populations of walleye, northern pike, yellow perch, and white suckers.
