= Bouder Lake =

Lake in the state of Minnesota, United States

- Location within Minnesota
- Location: Cook County, Minnesota, U.S.
- Coordinates: 47°50′28″N 90°44′54″W
- Primary outflows: Crescent Lake, Poplar River
- Basin countries: United States
- Surface area: 136 acres (55 ha)
- Max. depth: 17 feet (5.2 m)

Bouder Lake is a 129 acres (52 ha) lake in Cook County, Minnesota and a tributary of the Poplar River. Bouder Lake reaches a maximum depth of 17 feet (5.2 m) . Bouder is accessible through a navigable channel leading into Crescent Lake. A fisheries survey turned up populations of walleye, muskellunge, smallmouth bass, yellow perch, and white suckers. An aquatic plants survey found the lake to be home to several species of water marigolds, pondweed, bladderwort, water lily, burreed, sedges, and cattails.

On older maps, Bouder Lake has been named as Boulder Lake, Reck Lake, and Rush Lake.
