= Silver Lake (Cook County, Minnesota) =

Lake in the state of Minnesota, United States

- Location within Minnesota Location within the United States
- Location: Cook County, Minnesota, United States
- Coordinates: 47°47′5″N 90°45′48″W
- Primary outflows: Poplar River
- Basin countries: United States
- Surface area: 22 acres (0 km^{2})

Silver Lake is a 22-acre lake in Cook County, Minnesota which is a tributary to the Poplar River. Silver Lake is six feet deep and has clarity down to 4.5 feet. It has one inflow from Bulge Lake, and drains into Rice Lake South of the inflow on the northwest shore, most of the west shore is a brush bog. Silver Lake has a shoreline of 1.1 miles.

Because Silver Lake is connected to Rice Lake through a channel, both are expected to share the same fish population. Walleyes, Northern Pike, and Yellow Perch have been found in surveys of Silver Lake proper, and surveys of Rice Lake have shown a presence of white sucker.
