= Screech Lake (Minnesota) =

Lake in the state of Minnesota, United States

- Location within Minnesota Location within the United States
- Location: Cook County, Minnesota, United States
- Coordinates: 47°46′33″N 90°49′5″W
- Primary outflows: Poplar River
- Basin countries: United States
- Surface area: 16 acres (0 km^{2})

Screech Lake is a 16-acre lake in Cook County, Minnesota, which is a tributary to the Poplar River. Water clarity surveys performed by the University of Minnesota indicated Screech Lake had a visibility of 1.36 meters in 2008, although earlier surveys have yielded values of nearly 5 meters.
