= Crescent Lake (Minnesota) =

Lake in the state of Minnesota, United States

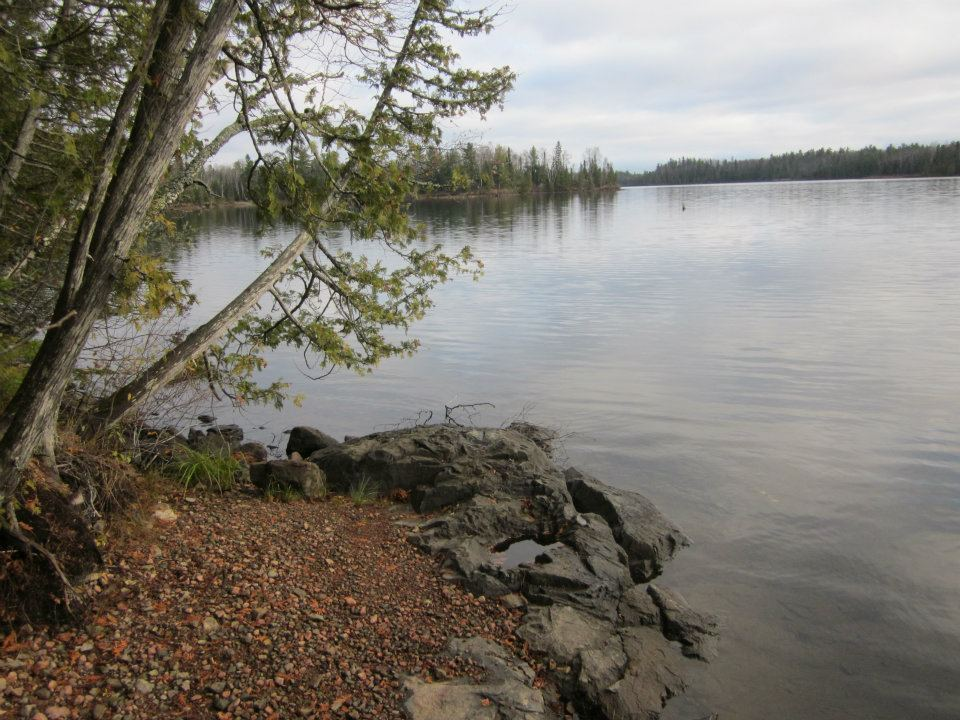

- Location within Minnesota
- Location: Tofte and Lutsen Townships, Cook County, Minnesota, US
- Coordinates: 47°49′30″N 90°45′37″W
- Primary inflows: Willow Creek, Bouder Lake, Lichen Lake
- Primary outflows: Poplar Creek
- Basin countries: United States
- Surface area: 774 acres (3 km^{2})
- Max. depth: 28 ft (9 m)
- Surface elevation: 1,791 ft (546 m)

Crescent Lake is a lake located in Tofte Township and Lutsen Township, Cook County, Minnesota.

== Geography ==
Crescent Lake lies to the south of the Boundary Waters Canoe Area ("BWCA"), along Forest Route 170. To the north, Crescent Lake receives water from Kinogami Lake, through Willow Creek, in the Willow Creek Unit, a 1360 acre roadless area inventoried by the Forest Service's second Roadless Area Review & Evaluation (RARE II) in 1979, but not added to the BWCA. To the east, Crescent Lake is connected to Bouder Lake by a shallow, but navigable channel, and also drains Lichen Lake. To the south, Crescent Lake empties through a series of small lakes into Rice Lake which in turn drains into the Poplar River and ultimately into Lake Superior.

Crescent Lake has an area of 744 acres, of which 558 are part of the littoral area. The maximum depth is 28 feet, and water clarity is 9.5 feet.

== Plant and animal life ==
The Minnesota DNR manages a section of 650 acres of mixed old growth forest on state land adjacent to the lake.

The lake is a sport fishing lake, and was stocked in the 1970s with walleye and muskellunge. Both populations are now naturally produced in the lake without further help from fisheries. While walleye caught by DNR surveys are generally larger than others caught in lakes of the same class, the muskellunge population measured have thus far all been below the legal catch length. Since muskellunge introduction, the older northern pike population has decreased.

During the 1990s, smallmouth bass appeared in Crescent Lake, and as of 2006 have spread from it as far south as Rice Lake, establishing themselves in all the major lakes in the upper watershed of Poplar River. Crescent Lake is also populated by yellow perch and white sucker.

== National Forest Campground ==
The United States Forest Service operates a 34 site fee campground on the west side of Crescent Lake, south of Forest Route 170. It features a boat launch onto Crescent Lake, canoe storage areas, vault toilets, and a quarter mile hiking trail. During the regular season, from April 29 through October 30, drinking water and garbage disposal are available, and the nightly fee is $16. 18 sites can be reserved during regular season. Electricity and dump stations are unavailable.
