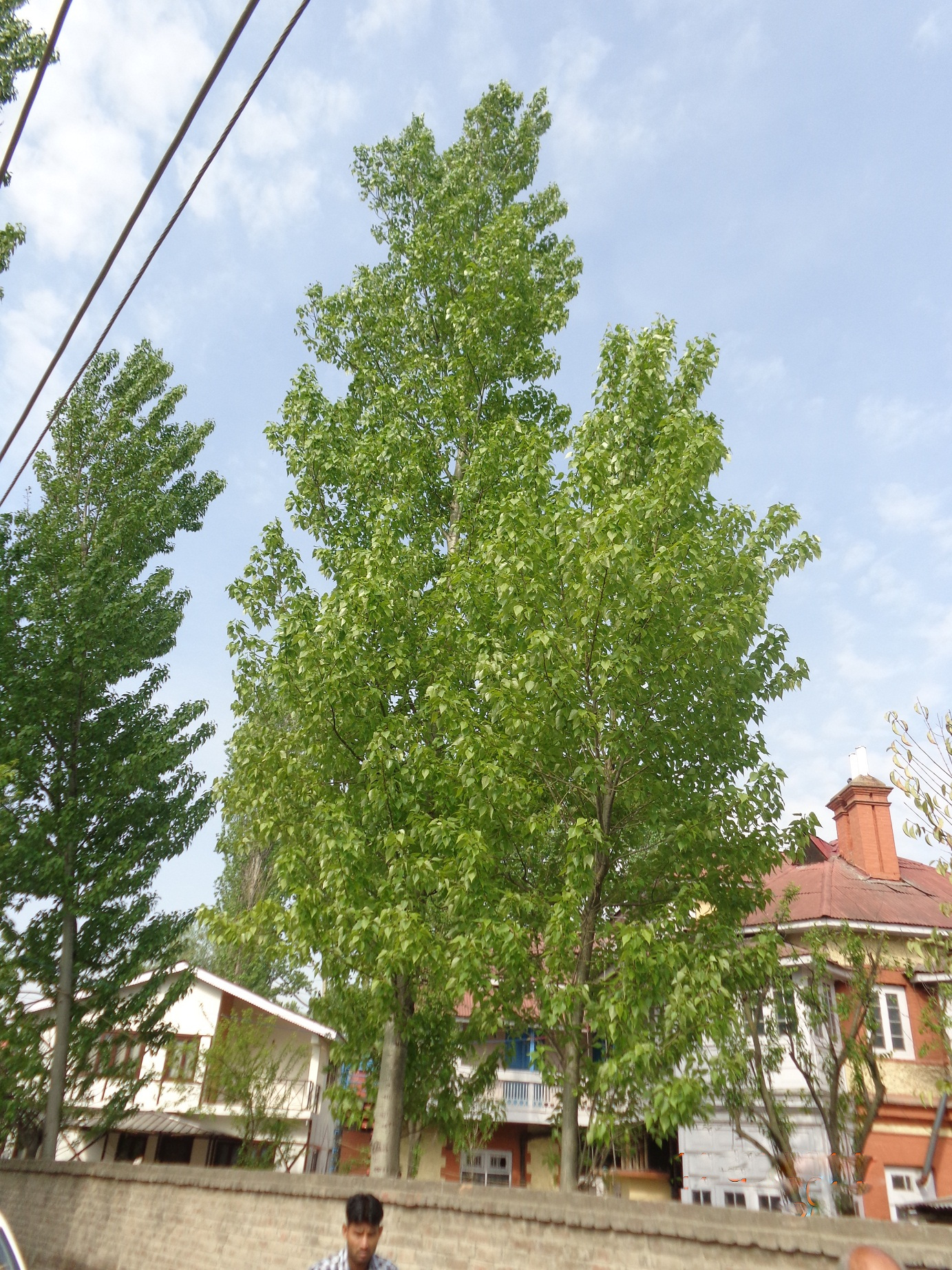

Conservation status
- Least Concern (IUCN 3.1)

Scientific classification
- Kingdom: Plantae
- Clade: Tracheophytes
- Clade: Angiosperms
- Clade: Eudicots
- Clade: Rosids
- Order: Malpighiales
- Family: Salicaceae
- Genus: Populus
- Section: Populus sect. Tacamahaca
- Species: P. ciliata

Binomial name
- Populus ciliata Wall. ex Royle

= Populus ciliata =

Species of tree

Populus ciliata, the Himalayan poplar, is a large deciduous tree with tall clean straight trunk and wide rounded crown. The bark of the young trees is smooth and greenish-grey while the bark of the old trees is dark brown with vertical cracks. Leaves are broadly ovate with hairy serrulate-crenate margins. Flowers are drooping raceme catkins that appear before or with leaves. Populus ciliata flowers are dioecious. Male flowers have a bell-shaped perianth and female flowers are bluntly toothed. A single capsule encloses an average of 100–150 seeds, which are covered by long silky hair.

== Ecology and distribution ==
=== Geographical distribution ===
Populus ciliata is natively distributed along the Himalayas through China, Pakistan, India (Jammu and Kashmir, Himachal Pradesh, Uttarakhand, Sikkim, Arunachal Pradesh), Nepal, Bhutan, and Myanmar. Populus ciliata is exotic to Afghanistan, France, Iran, Italy, Japan, New Zealand, and the United States.

=== Natural habitat ===
Populus ciliata prefers moist cool places and grows in sandy, loamy, and clay soil. It grows well in acidic or neutral soil conditions. Shade inhibits the growth of P. ciliata.

=== Reproductive biology ===
Populus ciliata is a dioecious tree pollinated by the wind. The fruits grow in about 3 months after pollination. Seed dispersal takes place from about the middle of June to the middle of July depending upon the climate. It can reproduce through seed and vegetative means.

== Propagation ==
The seeds weigh about 15 million/kg. In spring, seeds disperse as soon as they mature due to an extremely short period of viability of a few days after maturation. Fresh seeds exhibit high viability with a germination rate of up to 75–90%.

== Uses ==
=== Food ===
Populus ciliata is chopped for food and stored to be fed to livestock during times of food shortage.

=== Fuel ===
Populus ciliata is used as fuel wood.

=== Timber ===
Populus ciliata wood is used for making boxes for packing purposes, as well as for poles, trucks, barrow-trays, coaches, furniture and cross-beams.

=== Medicine ===
The bark is used to make tonics, stimulants and blood purifiers. The paste of the bark, when mixed with the ash of cow dung, can be used to treat muscular swellings.

=== Other ===
Populus ciliata provides paper for writing, wrapping and printing.

== Erosion control ==
This tree can be used to control erosion as it easily establishes in shallow soils, exhibits a fast growth rate, and produces numerous strong lateral roots with little taper. Hence, it has been used extensively in China, Japan, the USA and New Zealand to bind soil in erosion-prone areas.

== Pests and diseases ==
During rainy season, the leaves of the tree are extensively colonized by leaf defoliators such as Pyragea cupreata and P. fulgurita. In India, records show that this tree has been a victim of the plant parasite Loranthus elatus. Other pathogens that cause premature defoliation in this species include Bipolaris mydis, Pseudocercospora salicia and Phorma macrostoma. Incidents of ganoderma root rot have also been reported in this species.
