= Lichen Lake (Minnesota) =

Lake in the state of Minnesota, United States

- Location within Minnesota Location within the United States
- Location: Cook County, Minnesota, US
- Coordinates: 47°50′30″N 90°43′48″W
- Primary outflows: Poplar River
- Basin countries: United States
- Surface area: 276 acres (1 km^{2})

Lichen Lake is a 276-acre lake in Cook County, Minnesota which is a tributary to the Poplar River. It sits 1781 feet above sea level. Lichen Lake previously also went by the name Beaver Lake, but was formally affirmed in the present name in 1959 by the United States Board on Geographic Names.

A Minnesota DNR water plant survey of Lichen Lake found it to be home to numerous varieties of pondweed, burreed, and dozens of other species of plants. Ten different species were collected for the University of Minnesota herbarium. Lichen Lake is home to populations of walleye, northern pike, smallmouth bass, muskellunge, yellow perch, and white sucker.
