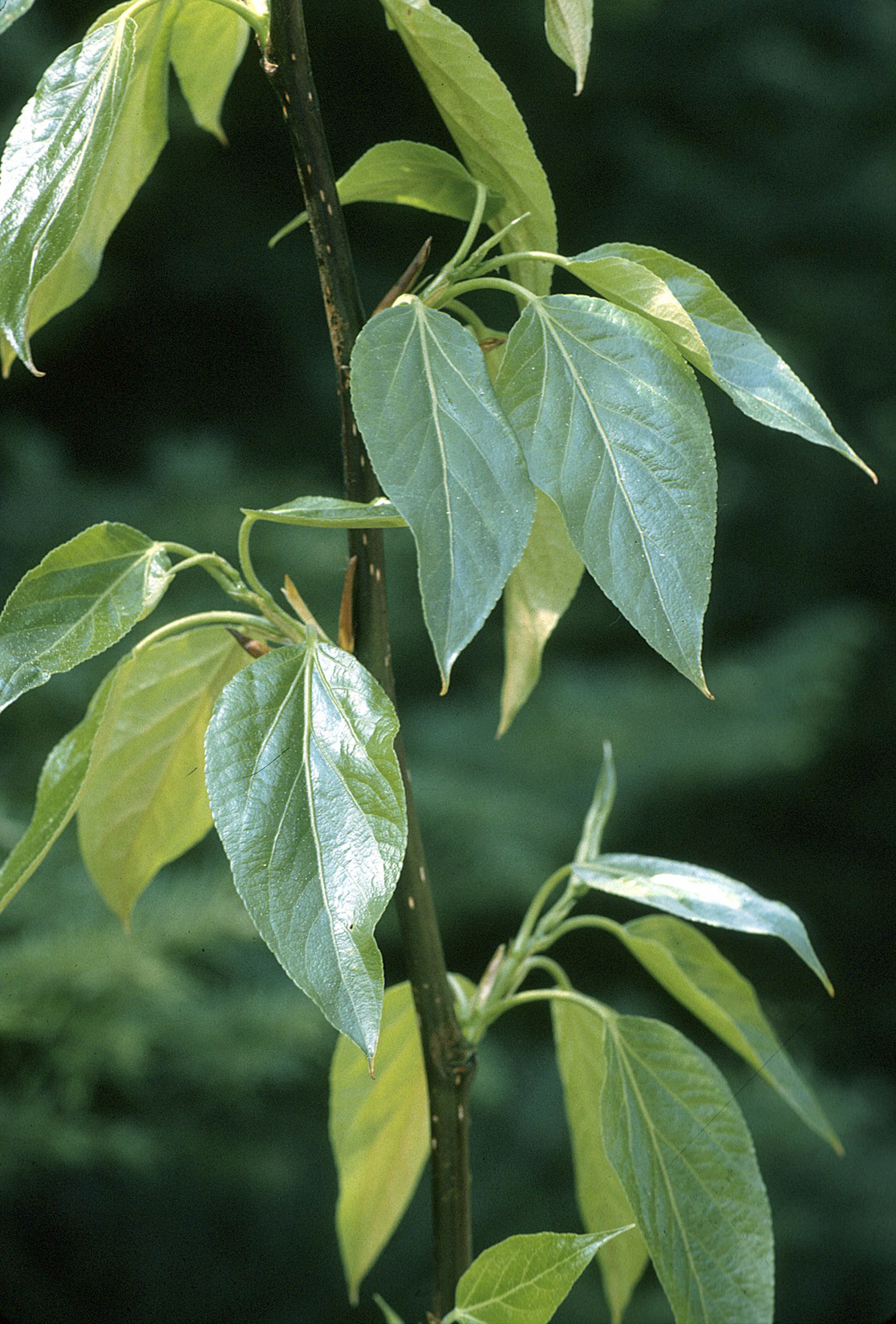
- A stem with young leaves

Conservation status
- Least Concern (IUCN 3.1)

Scientific classification
- Kingdom: Plantae
- Clade: Tracheophytes
- Clade: Angiosperms
- Clade: Eudicots
- Clade: Rosids
- Order: Malpighiales
- Family: Salicaceae
- Genus: Populus
- Section: Populus sect. Tacamahaca
- Species: P. balsamifera

Binomial name
- Populus balsamifera L.
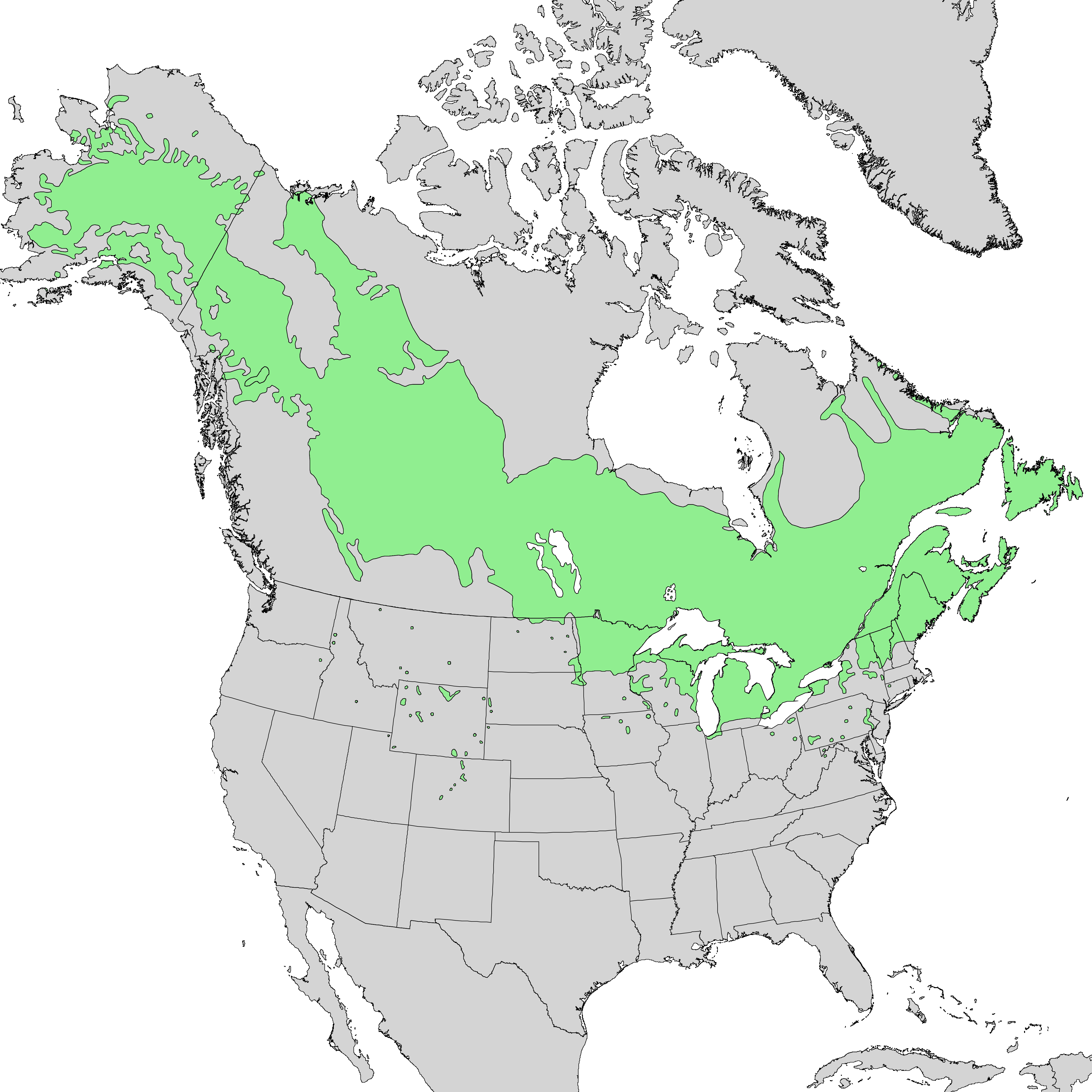
- Natural range in North America

Synonyms
- Populus tacamahacca Mill.; Populus candicans Aiton

= Populus balsamifera =

Species of tree

Populus balsamifera, commonly called balsam poplar, bam, bamtree, eastern balsam-poplar, hackmatack, tacamahac poplar, tacamahaca, is a tree species in the balsam poplar species group in the poplar genus, Populus. The genus name Populus is from the Latin for poplar, and the specific epithet balsamifera from Latin for "balsam-bearing".

Populus balsamifera is the northernmost North American hardwood, growing transcontinentally on boreal and montane upland and flood plain sites, and attaining its best development on flood plains. It is a hardy, fast-growing tree which is generally short lived, but some trees as old as 200 years have been found.

The tree is known for its strong, sweet fragrance, which emanates from its sticky, resinous buds. The smell has been compared to that of the balsam fir tree.

== Taxonomy ==
The black cottonwood, Populus trichocarpa, is sometimes considered a subspecies of P. balsamifera and may lend its common name to this species, although the black poplars and cottonwoods of Populus sect. Aigeiros are not closely related.

The balm-of-Gilead (Populus × jackii), also known as P. × gileadensis, is the hybrid between P. balsamifera and the eastern cottonwood (P. deltoides), occurring occasionally where the two parental species' ranges overlap. This hybrid is also sometimes planted as a shade tree, and sometimes escapes from cultivation. The name Populus candicans has been variously used for either P. balsamifera or P. × jackii; it is currently considered a synonym of P. balsamifera.

== Range ==
Balsam poplars have a native range that includes northern parts of North America and far eastern Russia. In Russia it is recorded as native in the World Geographical Scheme for Recording Plant Distributions basic recording unit of Magadan Oblast including Chukotka Autonomous Okrug.

In Alaska and Canada, its range forms a continuous belt from Alaska across Canada to Newfoundland. Large parts of this belt are found in the Yukon and the Northwest Territories in the far north with an edge extending into western Nunavut. In Western Canada, coverage is widespread in Alberta, Saskatchewan, and Manitoba, with it only extended into eastern and northern parts of British Columbia. In the east, it grows in almost all of Ontario, the southern half of Québec, southern Labrador, and all of the Maritime provinces and Newfoundland.

Parts of the balsam poplar's continuous range extend south into America. It grows across the northern half of Minnesota, northern Wisconsin, almost all of Michigan, parts of upstate New York, Vermont, northern New Hampshire, and most of Maine. In the Western United States, it also grows in isolated areas of Montana, the Dakotas, Wyoming, and Colorado. In the Midwest, it is also found in Iowa, Illinois, Indiana, Kentucky, and Ohio. In the east, pockets of trees are found native in Massachusetts, Connecticut, Pennsylvania, and West Virginia. Trees growing in Maryland are thought to be introduced.

== Uses ==
The light, soft wood of Populus balsamifera is used for pulp. The resinous sap (or the tree's balsam) comes from its buds, and is sometimes used as a hive disinfectant by bees.

Branches containing the resinous buds are sometimes blown to the ground by spring windstorms, and herbalists from many cultures seek these out to make medicine from them. These sticky spring buds are a highly prized ingredient in medicinal salves and other herbal preparations in both Indigenous North American and European herbal traditions.

Many kinds of animals use the twigs of Populus balsamifera for food. The leaves of the tree serve as food for caterpillars of various Lepidoptera.
