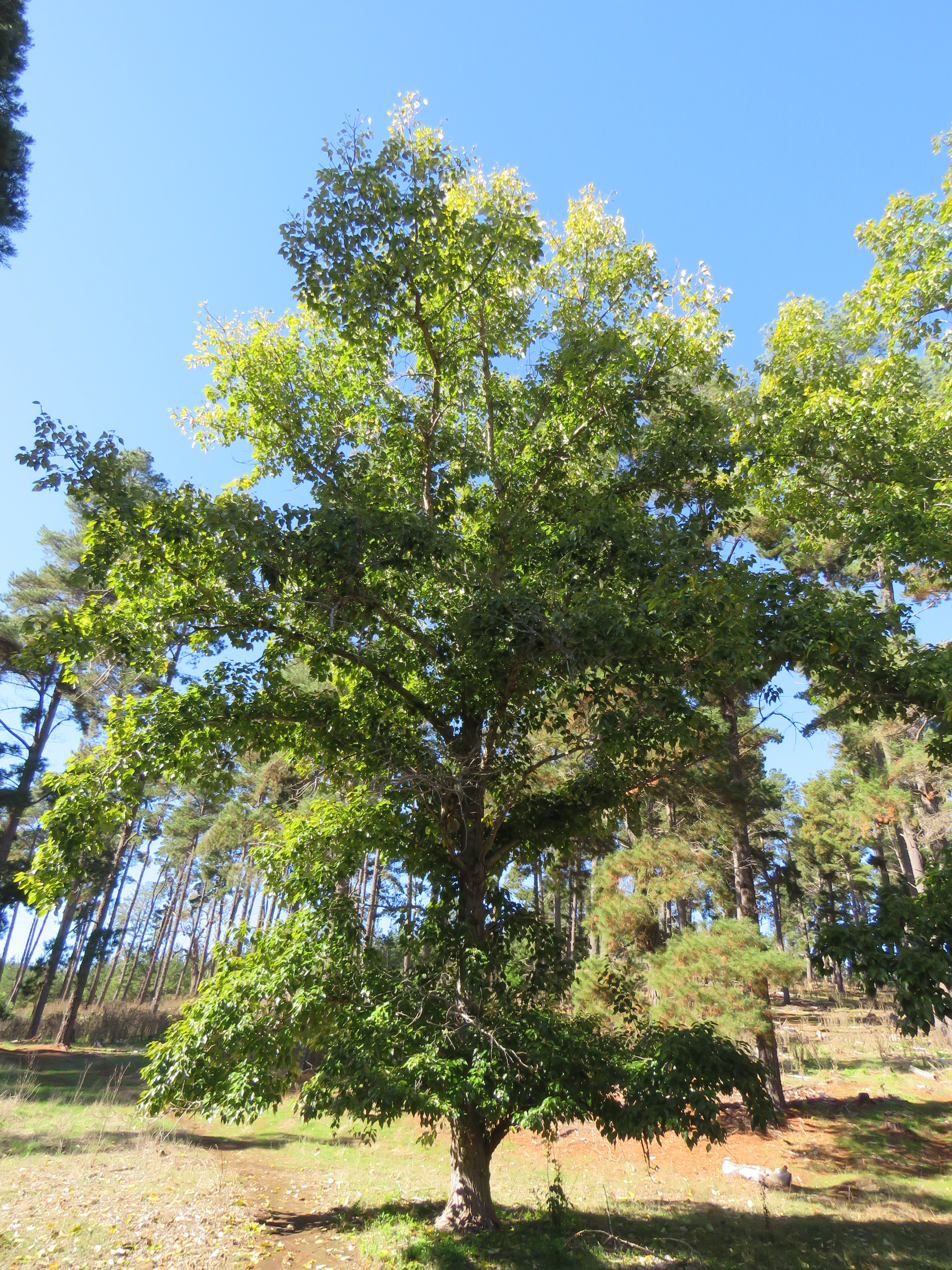
- In a park in Western Australia
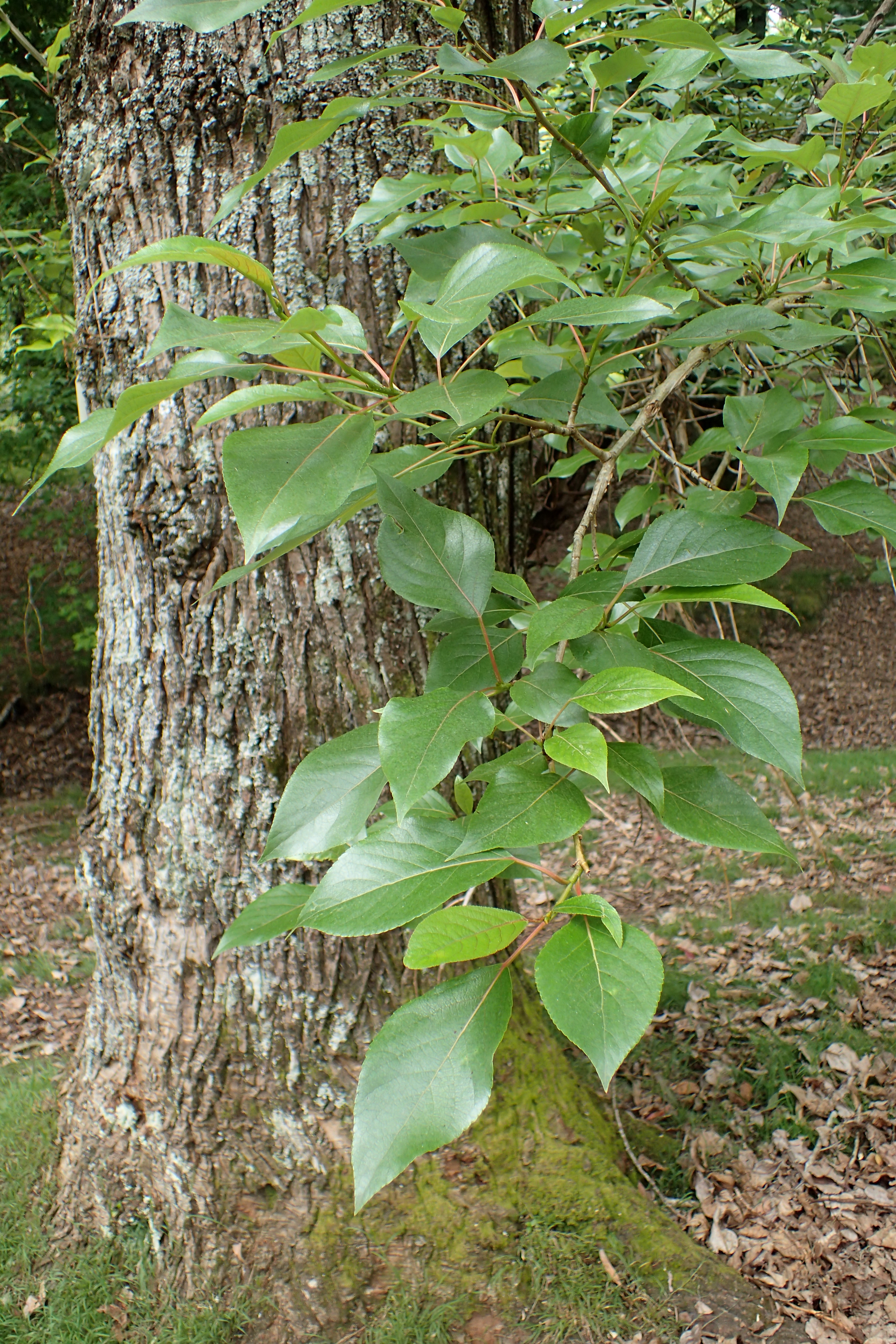
- Foliage

Scientific classification
- Kingdom: Plantae
- Clade: Embryophytes
- Clade: Tracheophytes
- Clade: Spermatophytes
- Clade: Angiosperms
- Clade: Eudicots
- Clade: Rosids
- Order: Malpighiales
- Family: Salicaceae
- Genus: Populus
- Species: P. yunnanensis

Binomial name
- Populus yunnanensis Dode

Synonyms
- Populus fangiana N.Chao & J.Liu; Populus fangiana var. microphylla (Z.Wang & S.L.Tung) N.Chao & J.Liu

= Populus yunnanensis =

Species of flowering plant

Populus yunnanensis, the Yunnan poplar, is a species of flowering plant in the family Salicaceae, native to south-central China. It has found use as a street tree, particularly in Australia.

== Subtaxa ==
The following varieties are accepted:

- Populus yunnanensis var. microphylla Z.Wang & S.L.Tung – Yunnan
- Populus yunnanensis var. yunnanensis – Sichuan, Yunnan, Guizhou
