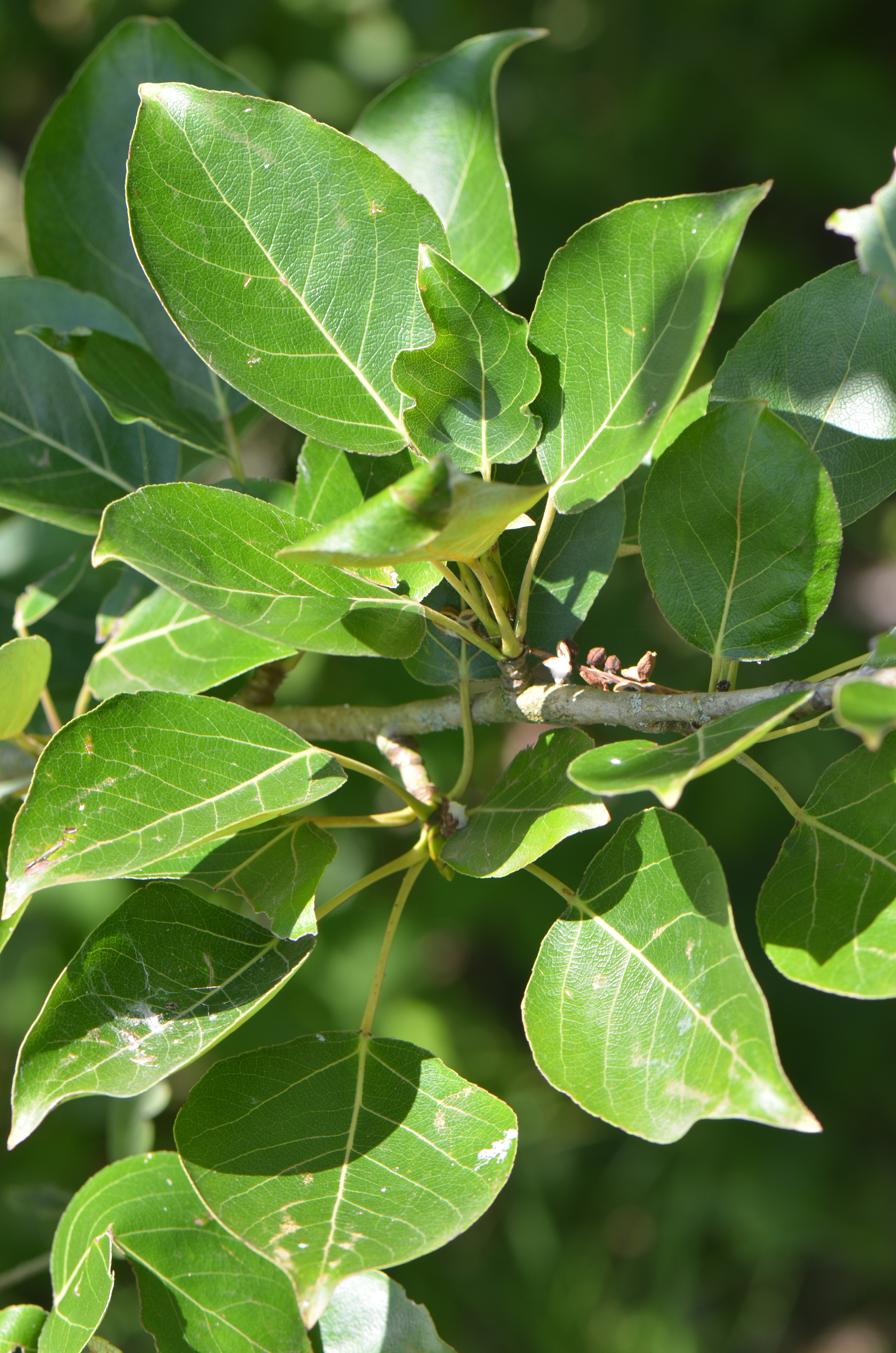
- Foliage

Scientific classification
- Kingdom: Plantae
- Clade: Embryophytes
- Clade: Tracheophytes
- Clade: Spermatophytes
- Clade: Angiosperms
- Clade: Eudicots
- Clade: Rosids
- Order: Malpighiales
- Family: Salicaceae
- Genus: Populus
- Species: P. laurifolia

Binomial name
- Populus laurifolia Ledeb.

Synonyms
- Populus amurensis Kom.; Populus crispa Dippel; Populus pilosa Rehder; Populus pilosa var. leiocarpa Z.Wang & S.L.Tung

= Populus laurifolia =

Species of flowering plant

Populus laurifolia, the laurel poplar, is a species of flowering plant in the family Salicaceae, native to Kazakhstan, the Altai, Mongolia, and Xinjiang in China. It hybridizes readily with other species of poplar, and has high genetic variation.
