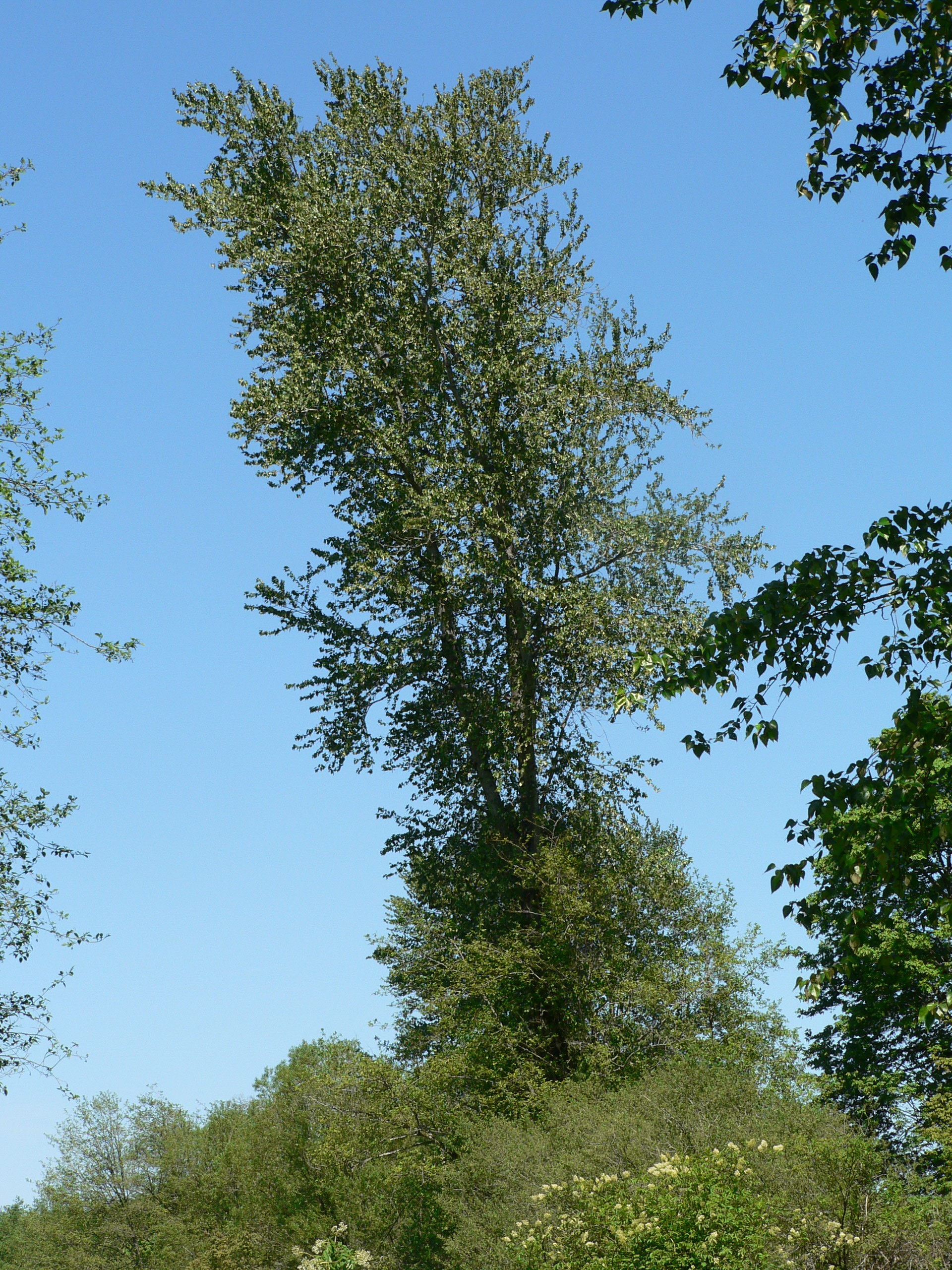
- Black cottonwood

Scientific classification
- Kingdom: Plantae
- Clade: Tracheophytes
- Clade: Angiosperms
- Clade: Eudicots
- Clade: Rosids
- Order: Malpighiales
- Family: Salicaceae
- Genus: Populus
- Section: Populus sect. Tacamahaca
- Species: P. trichocarpa

Binomial name
- Populus trichocarpa Torr. & A.Gray ex. Hook.
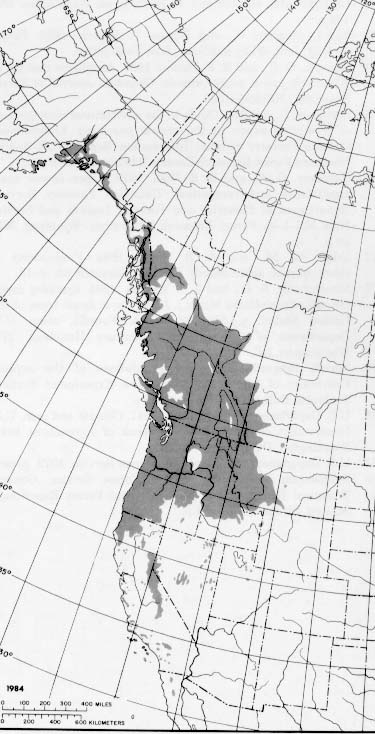
- Range

Synonyms
- Populus balsamifera subsp. trichocarpa (Torr. & A.Gray ex Hook.) Brayshaw

= Populus trichocarpa =

Species of tree

Populus trichocarpa, the black cottonwood, western balsam-poplar or California poplar, is a deciduous broadleaf tree species native to western North America. It is used for timber, and is notable as a model organism in plant biology. The tree is notable for the seed-carrying cottony fluff it releases into the air each spring.

== Description ==
It is a large tree, growing to a height of 30 to 50 m (98 to 164 ft) and a trunk diameter over 2 m (6 1/2 ft). It ranks 3rd in poplar species in the American Forests Champion Tree Registry. It is normally fairly short-lived, but some trees may live up to 400 years. A cottonwood in Willamette Mission State Park near Salem, Oregon, holds the national and world records. Last measured in April 2008, this black cottonwood was found to be standing at 47 m (155 ft) tall, 8.8 m (29 ft) around, with 527 points.

The bark is grey and covered with lenticels, becoming thick and deeply fissured on old trees. The bark can become hard enough to cause sparks when cut with a chainsaw. The stem is grey in the older parts and light brown in younger parts. The crown is usually roughly conical and quite dense. In large trees, the lower branches droop downwards. Spur shoots are common. The wood has a light coloring and a straight grain.

The leaves are usually 7–20 centimetres (2 3/4–7 3/4 in) long with a glossy, dark green upper side and glaucous, light grey-green underside; larger leaves may be up to 30 cm (11 3/4 in) long and may be produced on stump sprouts and very vigorous young trees. The leaves are alternate, elliptical with a crenate margin and an acute tip, and reticulate venation. The petiole is reddish. The buds are conical, long, narrow, and sticky, with a strong balsam scent in spring when they open.

P. trichocarpa has an extensive and aggressive root system, which can invade and damage drainage systems. Sometimes, the roots can even damage the foundations of buildings by drying out the soil.

In 2016, the first direct evidence was published indicating that wild P. trichocarpa fixes nitrogen.

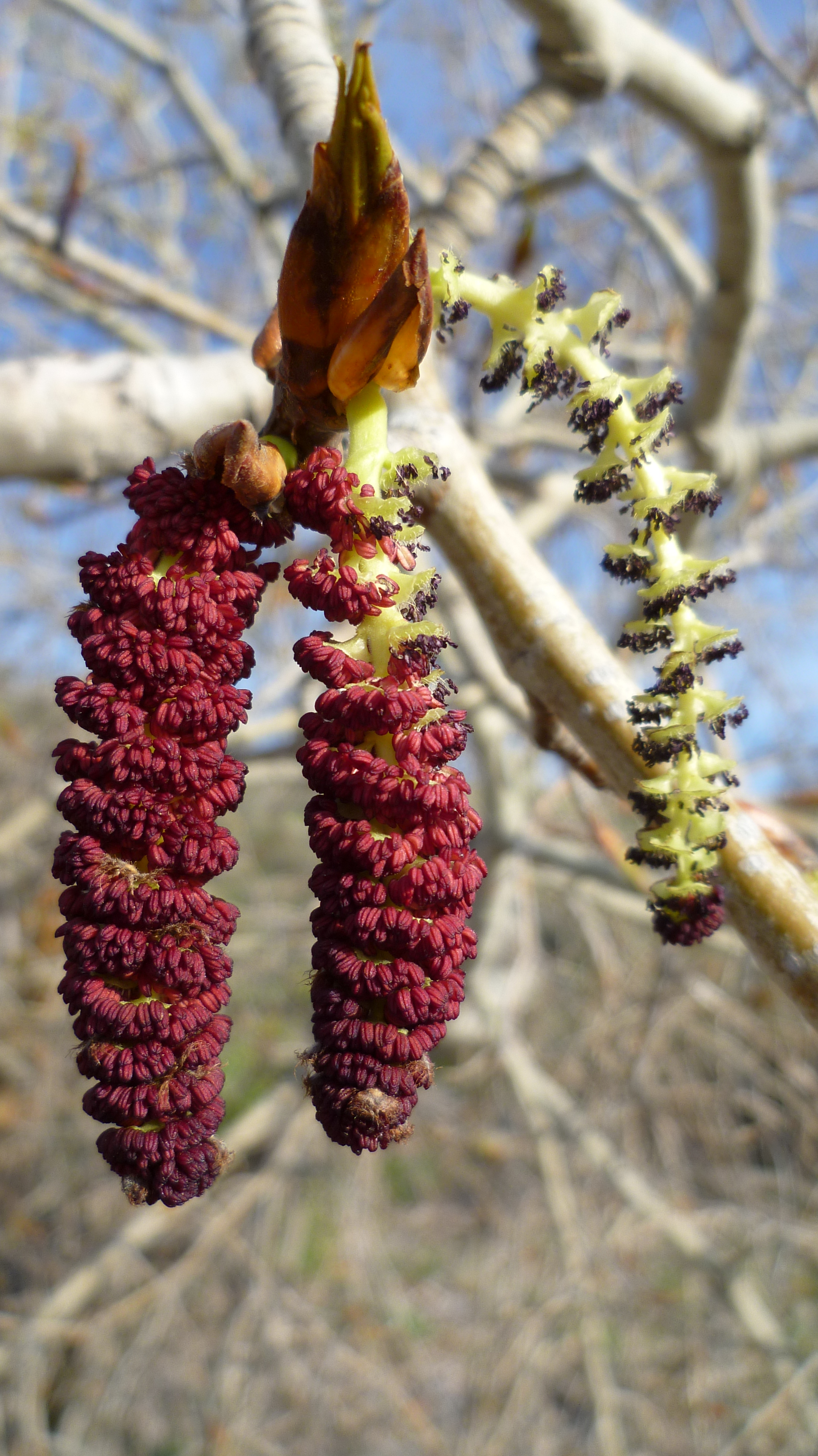
emerging male catkins

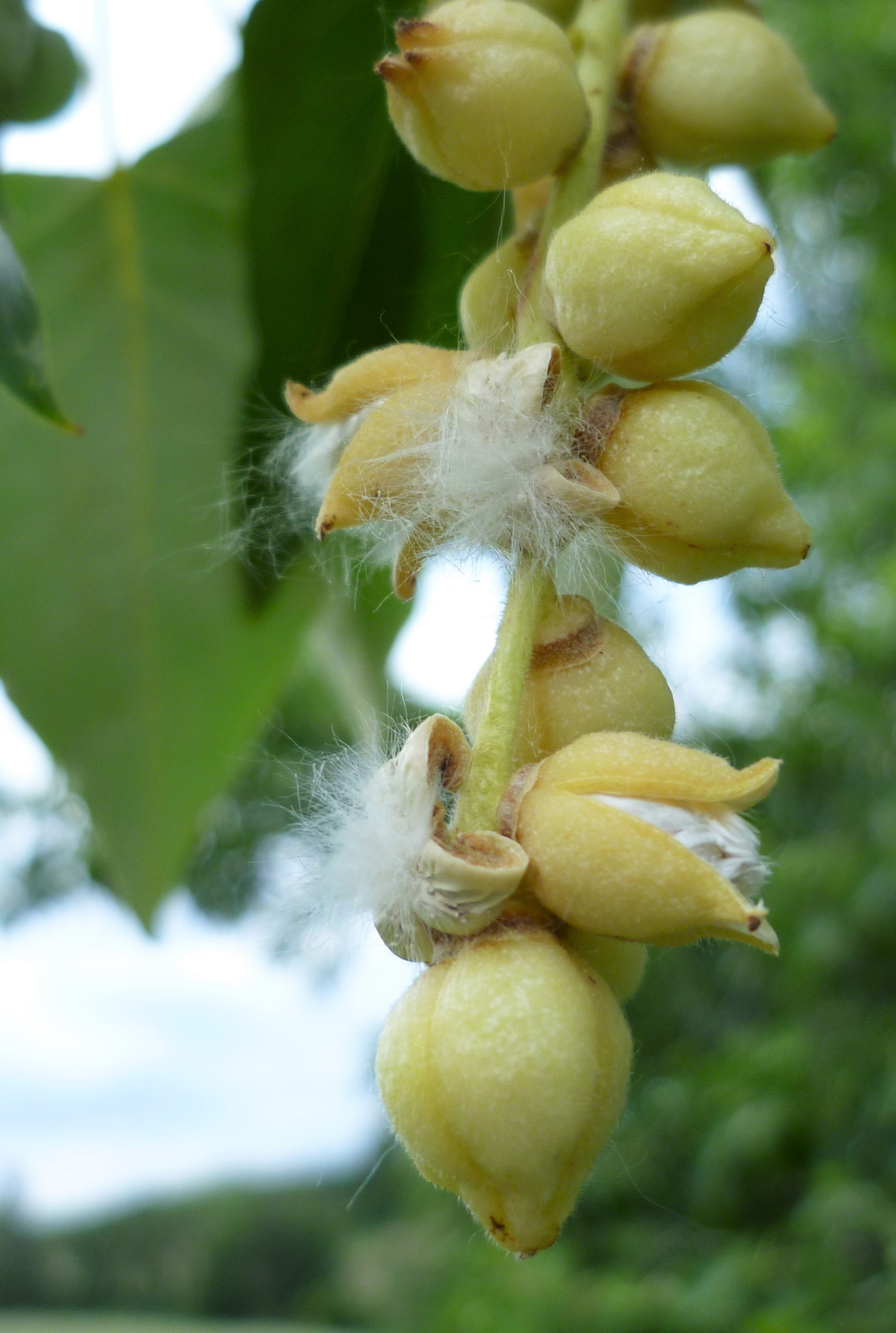
female catkins opening

=== Reproduction ===
==== Flowering and fruiting ====
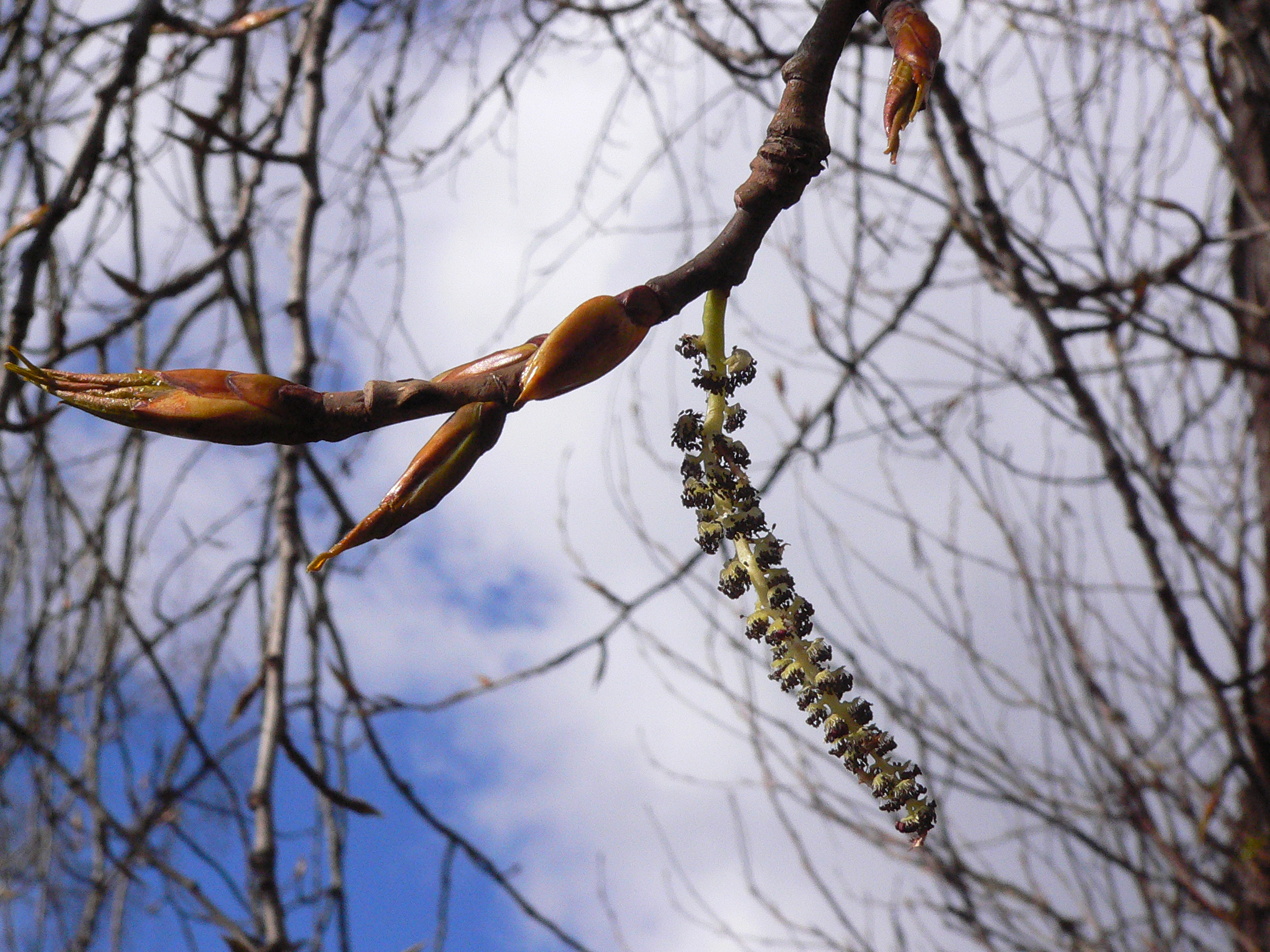
Male (pollen-producing) catkin and leaf buds in March. Sherwood, Oregon.

P. trichocarpa is normally dioecious; male and female catkins are borne on separate trees. The species reaches flowering age around 10 years. Flowers may appear in early March to late May in Washington and Oregon, and sometimes as late as mid-June in northern and interior British Columbia, Idaho, and Montana. Staminate catkins contain 30 to 60 stamens, elongated to 2 to 3 cm, and are deciduous. The pollen can be an allergen. Pistillate catkins at maturity are 8 to 20 cm long with rotund-ovate, tricarpellate subsessile fruits 5 to 8 mm long. Each capsule contains many minute seeds with long, white, cottony hairs.

==== Seed production and dissemination ====
The seed ripens and is disseminated by late May to late June in Oregon and Washington, but frequently not until mid-July in Idaho and Montana. Abundant seed crops are usually produced every year. Attached to its cotton, the seed is light and buoyant and can be transported long distances by wind and water. Although highly viable, longevity of P. trichocarpa seed under natural conditions may be as short as two weeks to a month. This can be increased with cold storage.

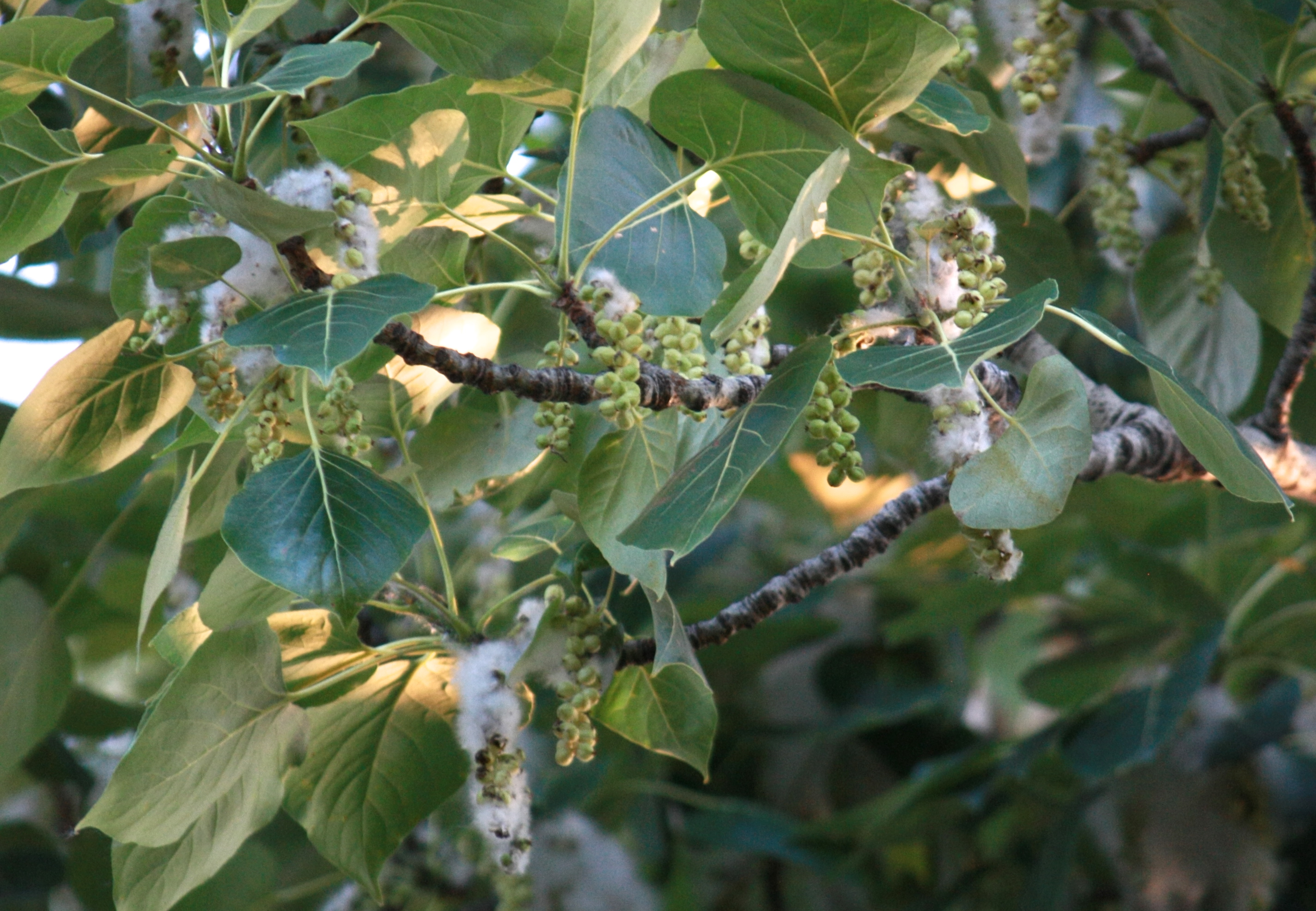
Seeds and fluff of cottonwood in July. Boise, Idaho.

==== Seedling development ====
Moist seedbeds are essential for high germination, and seedling survival depends on continuously favorable conditions during the first month. Wet bottomlands of rivers and major streams frequently provide such conditions, particularly where bare soil has been exposed or new soil laid down. Germination is epigeal (above ground). P. trichocarpa seedlings do not usually become established in abundance after logging unless special measures are taken to prepare the bare, moist seedbeds required for initial establishment. Where seedlings become established in great numbers, they thin out naturally by age five because the weaker seedlings of this shade-intolerant species are suppressed.

==== Vegetative reproduction ====
Due to its high levels of rooting hormones, P. trichocarpa sprouts readily. After logging operations, it sometimes regenerates naturally from rooting of partially buried fragments of branches or from stumps. Sprouting from roots also occurs. The species also has the ability to abscise shoots complete with green leaves. These shoots drop to the ground and may root where they fall or may be dispersed by water transport. In some situations, abscission may be one means of colonizing exposed sandbars.

== Taxonomy ==
"Trichocarpa" is Greek for "hairy fruits". These scientific names are now considered synonymous with P. trichocarpa:

- P. balsamifera subsp. trichocarpa
- P. balsamifera var. californica
- P. hastata
- P. trichocarpa subsp. hastata
- P. trichocarpa var. hastata
- P. trichocarpa var. cupulata
- P. trichocarpa var. ingrata

== Distribution and habitat ==
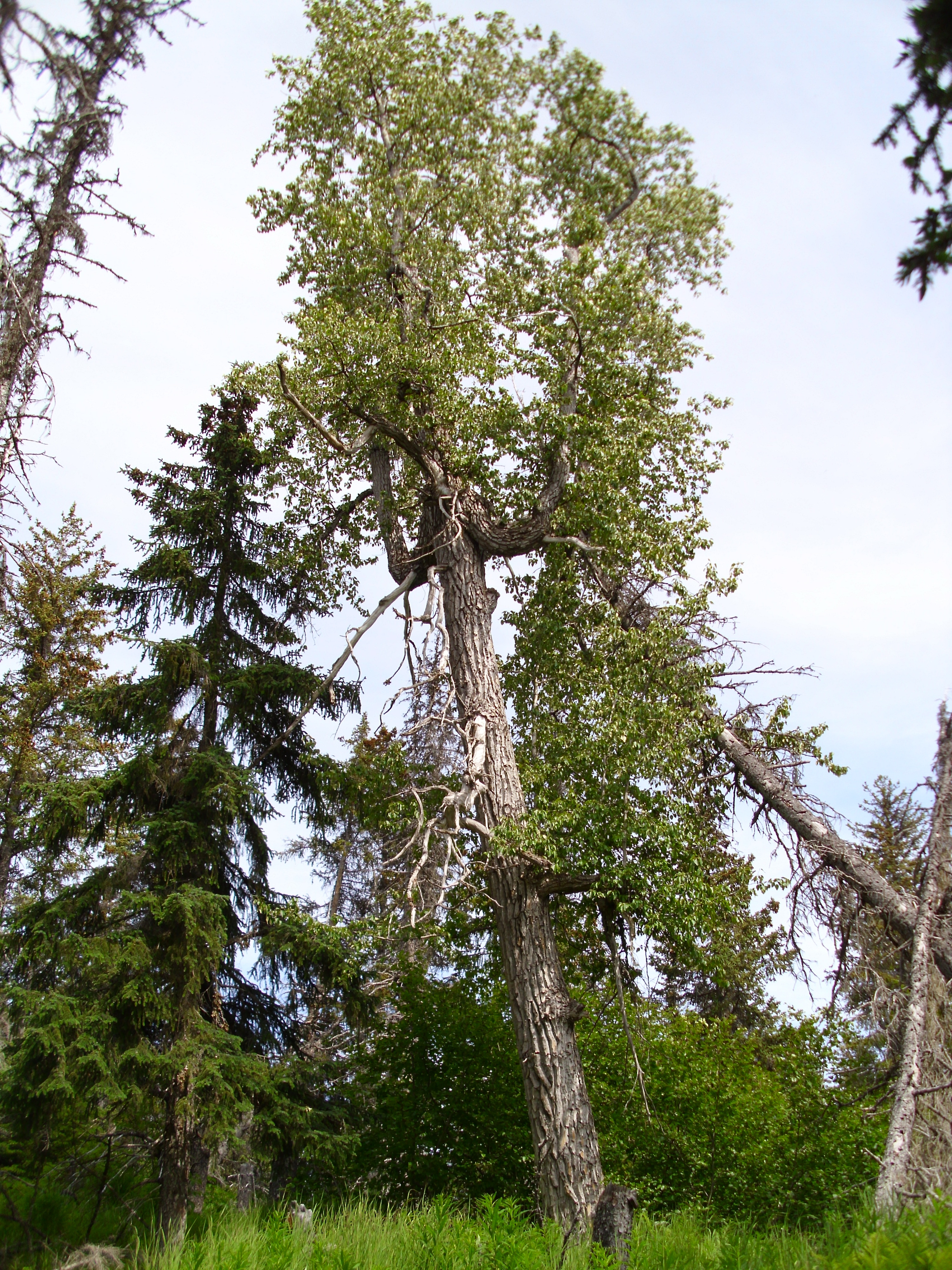
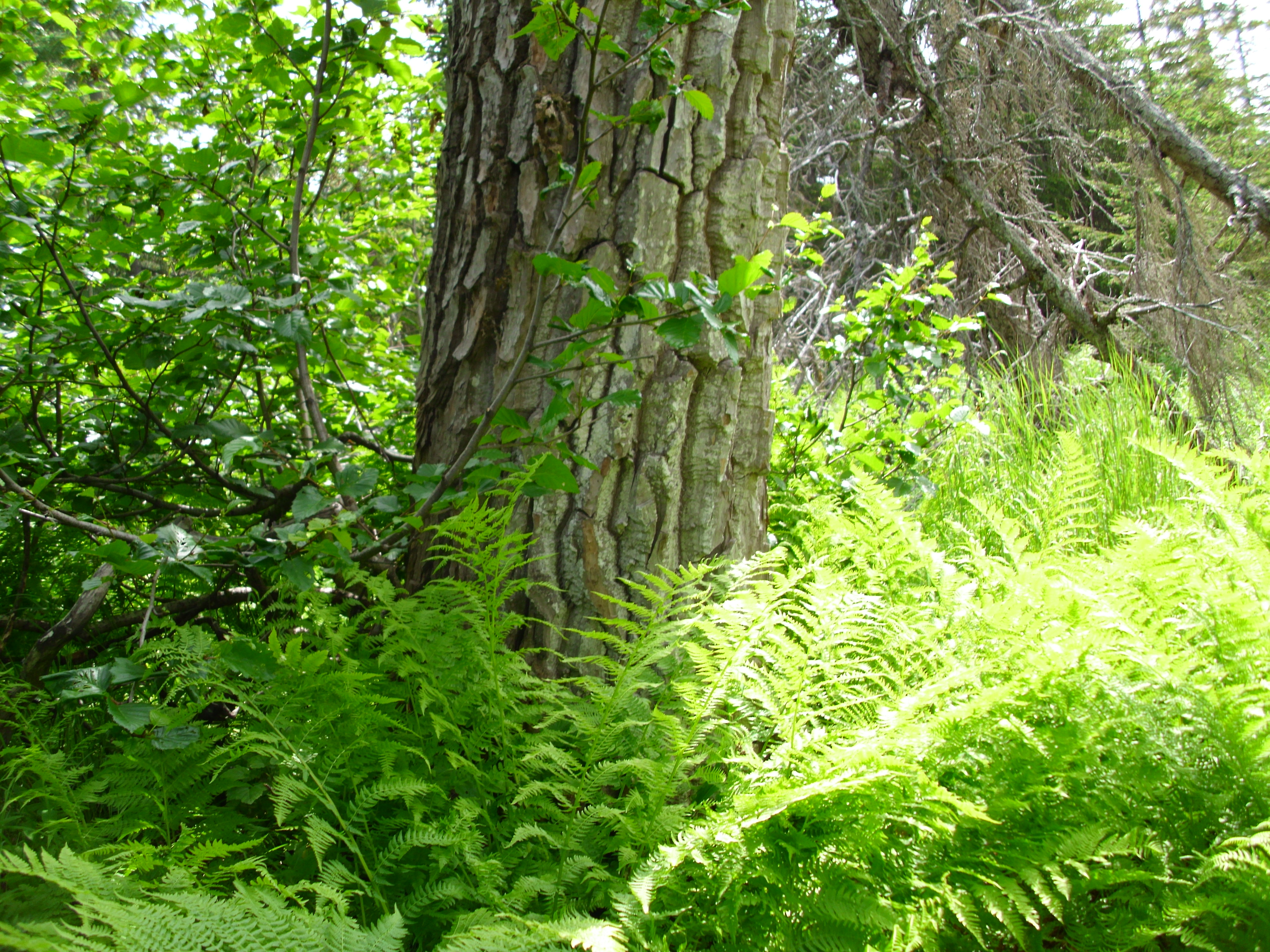
A large specimen in Diamond Ridge, Alaska, and the bark at its base

The native range of P. trichocarpa covers large sections of western North America. It extends from Southeast Alaska's Kodiak Island and Cook Inlet to latitude 62° 30° N., through British Columbia and the forested areas of Washington and Oregon, to the mountains in southern California and northern Baja California (31°N). It is also found inland, generally on the west side of the Rocky Mountains, in British Columbia, southwestern Alberta, western Montana, and north-to-central Idaho. Scattered small populations have been noted in southeastern Alberta, eastern Montana, western Wyoming, Utah, and Nevada.

Black cottonwood grows on alluvial sites, riparian habitats, and moist woods on mountain slopes, from sea level to elevations of 2,100–2,750 m (6,890–9,020 ft). It often forms extensive stands on bottomlands of major streams and rivers at low elevations along the Pacific Coast, west of the Cascade Range. In eastern Washington and other dry areas, it is restricted to protected valleys and canyon bottoms, along streambanks, and edges of ponds and meadows. It grows on a variety of soils from moist silts, gravels, and sands to rich humus, loams, and occasionally clays. Black cottonwood is a pioneer species that grows best in full sunlight and commonly establishes on recently disturbed alluvium. Seeds are numerous and widely dispersed because of their cottony tufts, enabling the species to colonize even burn sites, if conditions for establishment are met. Seral communities dominated or codominated by cottonwood are maintained by periodic flooding or other types of soil disturbance. Black cottonwood has low drought tolerance; it is flood-tolerant but cannot tolerate brackish water or stagnant pools.

P. trichocarpa has been one of the most successful introductions of trees to the otherwise almost treeless Faroe Islands.

The species was imported from Alaska to Iceland in 1944 and has since become one of the most widespread trees in the country.

== Ecology ==
Although the most populous cottonwood of the Pacific Northwest, it hybridizes with the region's three other species: balsam poplar, plains cottonwood, and narrowleaf cottonwood; all four have similar appearances and provide habitats for various animals.

Cottonwoods are shade intolerant. Black cottonwood thrives by colonizing disturbed sites, but can be replaced by conifers. The wood is relatively weak and waterlogged, often splitting during freezes. It is susceptible to rot as well. Woodpeckers create cavities which various animals can use for nests. Larger birds nest in the large upper branches. Beavers use the trees as food and dam-building material.

=== Conservation ===
Populus trichocarpa was evaluated by NatureServe in 2016, but with they consider it a subspecies of Populus balsamifera. Under this name they rated it as a secure subspecies (T5).

== Cultivation ==
It is grown as an ornamental tree, valued for its fast growth and scented foliage in spring, detectable from over 100 m distance. The roots are however invasive, and it can damage the foundations of buildings on shrinkable clay soils if planted nearby (Mitchel 1996).

Branches can be added to potted plants to stimulate rooting.

== Uses ==
=== Traditional ===
The tree was and is significant for many Native American tribes of the Western United States. Some Native Americans consumed cottonwood inner bark and sap, feeding their horses the inner bark and foliage. The wood, roots and bark have been used for firewood, canoe making, rope, fish traps, baskets and structures. The gum-like sap was used as a glue or as waterproofing. The Quinault used it for post wood. The Cowlitz made the base (hearth board) of their fire-making tool, a bow drill, with its wood. The Squaxin cut young branches for building sweat lodges.

=== Medicinal ===
The tree had medicinal value as well. The Squaxin used the bark for sore throats and for the treatment of tuberculosis, as well as water and the bruised leaves as an antiseptic mixture. The Klallam used the buds for an eye treatment. The Quinault extracted gum from the burls and applied it to cuts on the skin.

=== Modern ===
Commercial extracts are produced from the fragrant buds for use as a perfume in cosmetics.

The shredded and heat treated wood is sold a pet snake bedding material, with its softness, water absorbency, and low maintenance described as its primary properties.

=== Lumber ===
P. trichocarpa wood is light-weight and although not particularly strong, is strong for its weight. The wood material has short, fine cellulose fibres that are used in pulp for high-quality book and magazine paper. The wood is also excellent for production of plywood. Living trees are used as windbreaks.

This species grows very quickly; trees in plantations in Great Britain have reached 18 m (59 ft) tall in 11 years, and 34 m (112 ft) tall in 28 years. It can reach suitable size for pulp production in 10–15 years and about 25 years for timber production.

=== As a model species ===
Populus trichocarpa has several qualities that makes it a good model species for trees:

- Model genome size (although significantly larger than the other model plant, Arabidopsis thaliana)
- Rapid growth (for a tree)
- Reaches reproductive maturity 4–6 years
- Economically important
- It represents a phenotypically diverse genus

For these reasons, the species has been extensively studied. Its genome sequence was published in 2006. More than 121,000 expressed sequence tags have been sequenced from it. The wide range of topics studied by using P. trichocarpa include the effects of ethylene, lignin biosynthesis, drought tolerance, and wood formation.

== Cultural significance ==
The Chehalis believed that the tree was intelligent and had a form of special physical agency, moving on its own without the need of wind. Due to this belief, they refused to use it for firewood.

== Genome ==
The sequence of P. trichocarpa is that of an individual female specimen "Nisqually-1", named after the Nisqually River in Washington, where the specimen was collected. The sequencing was performed at the Joint Genome Institute using the shotgun method. The depth of the sequencing was about 7.5 x (meaning that each base pair was sequenced on average 7.5 times). Genome annotation was done primarily by the Joint Genome Institute, the Oak Ridge National Laboratory, the Umeå Plant Science Centre, and Genome Canada.

Prior to the publication of P. trichocarpa genome the only available plant genomes were those of thale cress and rice, both of which are herbaceous. P. trichocarpa is the first woody plant genome to be sequenced. Considering the economic importance of wood and wood products, the availability of a tree genome was necessary. The sequence also allows evolutionary comparisons and the elucidation of basic molecular differences between herbaceous and woody plants.

=== Characteristics ===
- Size: 485 million base pairs (human genome: 3 billion base pairs)
- Proportion of heterochromatin to euchromatin: 3:7
- Number of chromosomes: 19
- Number of putative genes: 45,555, the largest number of genes ever recorded (estimate in September 2008)
- Mitochondrial genome: 803,000 base pairs, 52 genes
- Chloroplast genome: 157,000 base pairs, 101 genes

=== Somatic mosaicism ===
Genome-wide analysis of 11 clumps of P. trichocarpa trees reveals significant genetic differences between the roots and the leaves and branches of the same tree. The variation within a specimen is as much as found between unrelated trees. These results may be important in resolving debate in evolutionary biology regarding somatic mutation (that evolution can occur within individuals, not solely among populations), with a variety of implications.
