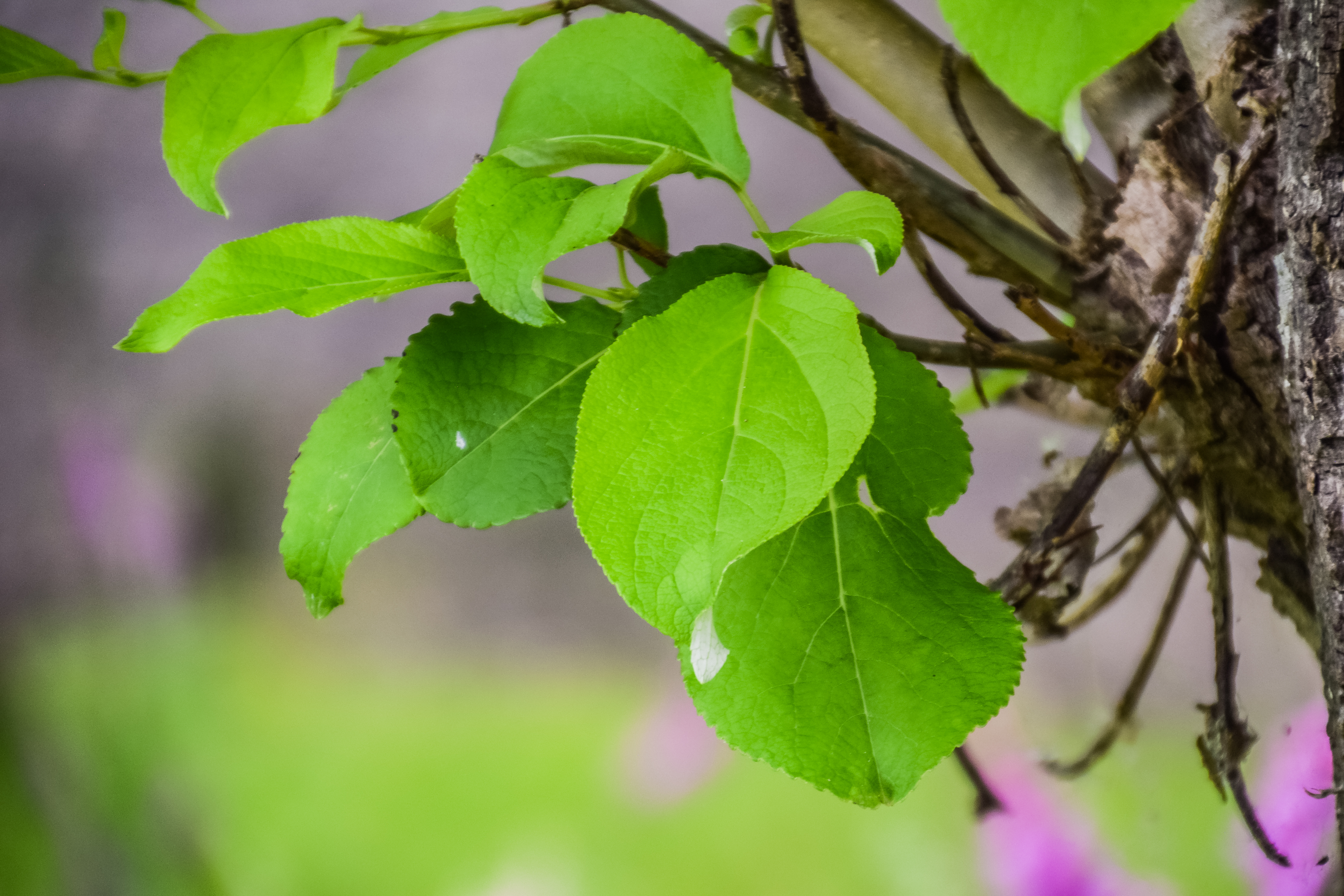
- Populus suaveolens in Hackfalls Arboretum

Conservation status
- Least Concern (IUCN 3.1)

Scientific classification
- Kingdom: Plantae
- Clade: Embryophytes
- Clade: Tracheophytes
- Clade: Spermatophytes
- Clade: Angiosperms
- Clade: Eudicots
- Clade: Rosids
- Order: Malpighiales
- Family: Salicaceae
- Genus: Populus
- Species: P. suaveolens

Binomial name
- Populus suaveolens Fisch. ex Poit. & A.Vilm.

Synonyms
- List: Populus balsamifera var. suaveolens (Fisch. ex Poit. & A.Vilm.) Kuntze; Populus × charbinensis Z.Wang & Skvortzov; Populus komarovii J.J.Vassil. ex Vorosch.; Populus koreana Rehder; Populus maximowiczii Henry; Populus pseudobalsamifera Turcz.; Populus ussuriensis Kom.; Populus vetla Wolkenst.; Populus vetla R.I.Schröd.

= Populus suaveolens =

Species of flowering plant

Populus suaveolens, called the Mongolian poplar, Korean poplar and Japanese poplar, is a species of flowering plant in the genus Populus, native to all of northern Asia, the Korean peninsula, the Kurils, and northern Japan. It is a tree reaching 30 m (98 ft).

== Forms ==
The following form is currently accepted:

- Populus suaveolens f. baicalensis (Kom.) I.V.Belyaeva & Kovt.
