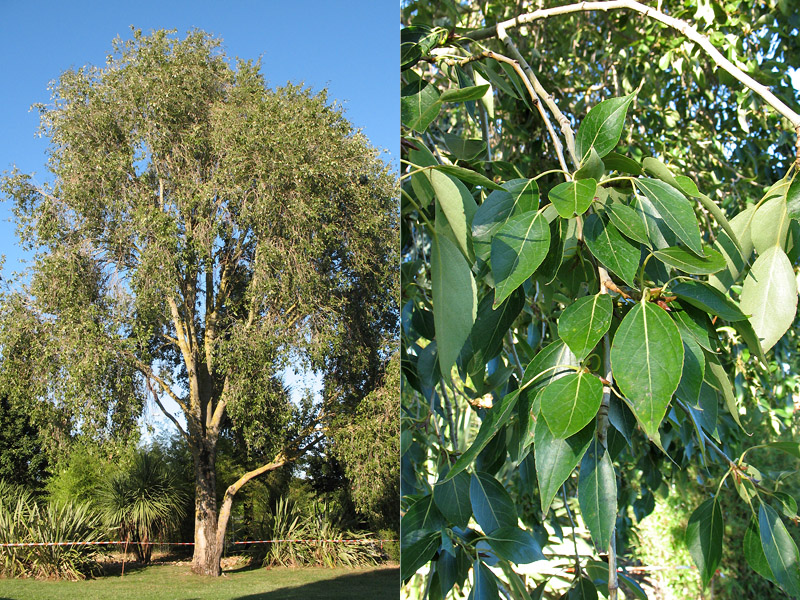

Scientific classification
- Kingdom: Plantae
- Clade: Embryophytes
- Clade: Tracheophytes
- Clade: Spermatophytes
- Clade: Angiosperms
- Clade: Eudicots
- Clade: Rosids
- Order: Malpighiales
- Family: Salicaceae
- Genus: Populus
- Species: P. simonii

Binomial name
- Populus simonii Carrière

Synonyms
- Populus przewalskii Maxim

= Populus simonii =

Species of flowering plant

Populus simonii, Simon's poplar, Simon poplar, or Chinese cottonwood, is a species of poplar native to northeast China and to Mongolia, and commonly planted as a street tree in cool temperate areas of Europe. There have been introductions into North America, South Africa, Australia and New Zealand.
