= Rice Lake (Cook County, Minnesota) =

Lake in the state of Minnesota, United States

- Location within Minnesota Location within the United States
- Location: Cook County, Minnesota, United States
- Coordinates: 47°47′00″N 90°46′41.5″W
- Primary outflows: Poplar River
- Basin countries: United States
- Surface area: 222.52 acres (1 km^{2})
- Max. depth: 10 ft (3 m)
- Surface elevation: 1,737 ft (529 m)

Rice Lake is a lake in Cook County, Minnesota.

== Topography ==
Rice lake lies in the Poplar River watershed, receiving inflow from Crescent Lake in the north, and outflowing into the main branch of the Poplar River. Rice Lake has an area of 222.52 acres and a maximum depth of ten feet. 182 acres are in the littoral zone, and the water is clear down five feet. It lies 1737 feet above sea level.
