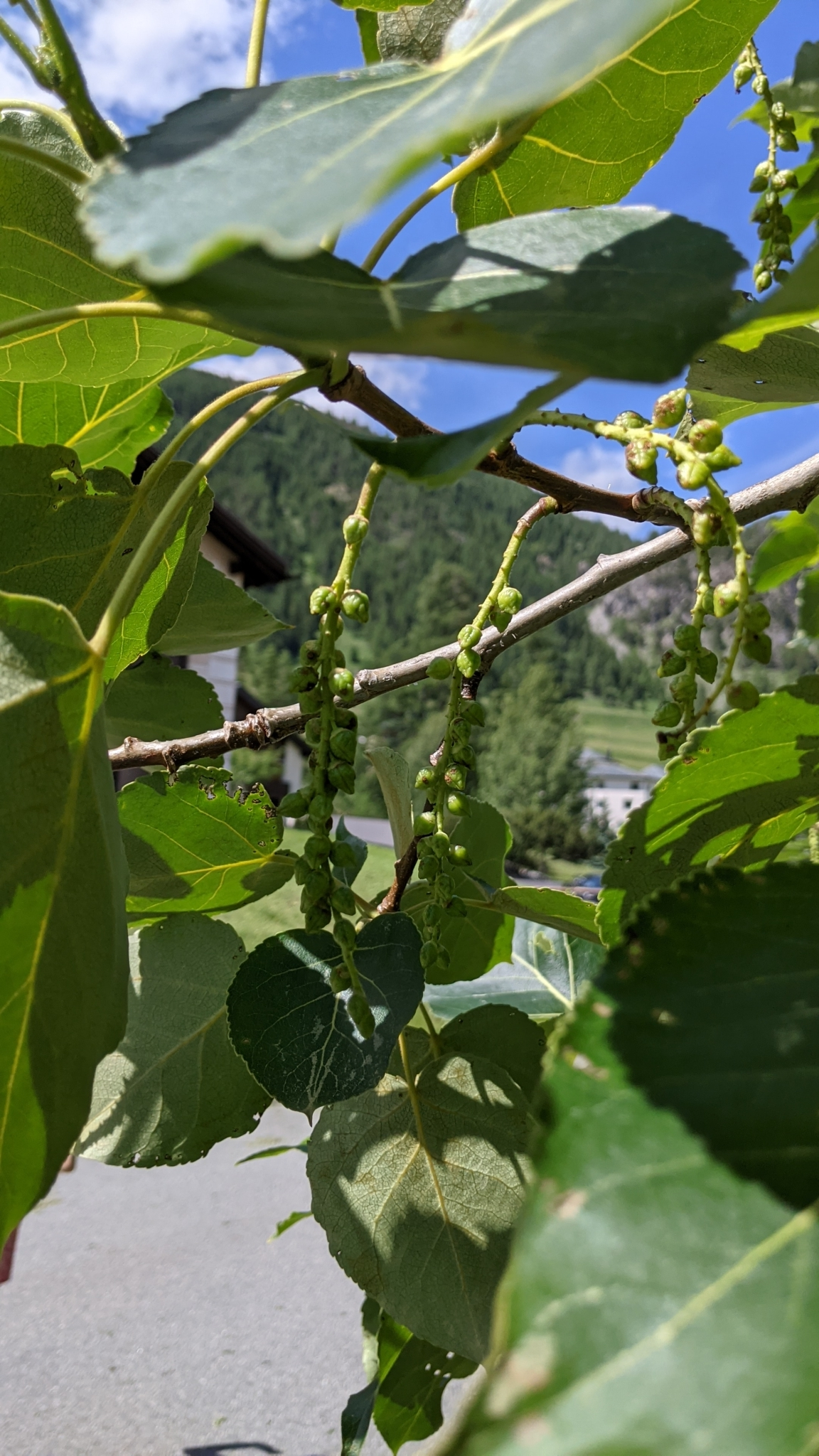

Scientific classification
- Kingdom: Plantae
- Clade: Tracheophytes
- Clade: Angiosperms
- Clade: Eudicots
- Clade: Rosids
- Order: Malpighiales
- Family: Salicaceae
- Genus: Populus
- Species: P. × jackii

Binomial name
- Populus × jackii Sarg.

Synonyms
- Populus × gileadensis Rouleau; Populus manitobensis Dode

= Populus × jackii =

Balm-of-Gilead

Hybrid species of tree

Populus × jackii (balm-of-Gilead, bam bud, bom-a-gilly) is the hybrid between balsam poplar, Populus balsamifera, and the eastern cottonwood, Populus deltoides, occurring occasionally where the two parental species' ranges overlap. The name is considered a synonym of Populus ontariensis. It is sometimes called a cottonwood. This hybrid is also sometimes planted as a shade tree, and occasionally escapes from cultivation. This hybrid is also known by the synonyms:

- Populus × andrewsii Sargent
- Populus × bernardii Boivin
- Populus candicans W. Aiton
- Populus × dutillyi Lepage
- Populus × generosa Henry
- Populus × gileadensis Rouleau
- Populus manitobensis Dode.

The parental balsam poplar, P. balsamifera, is also known as P. tacamahaca and P. trichocarpa, and is widespread in boreal North America. The name Populus candicans has been variously used for either P. balsamifera or P. × jackii; it is currently considered a synonym of P. balsamifera.

== Fragrant resin ==
The tree is named after the unrelated biblical Balm of Gilead, a Commiphora resin. Its leaf buds are coated with a resinous sap with a strong, pleasant turpentine or balsam odor that is most evident as the leaves unfold in the spring. For purposes of commerce, the buds are collected before they open, and can be cut up for pot-pourri or used in herbal medicine. Like other poplars, balm-of-Gilead is expected to contain salicin in its bark, and in relation to traditional herbal treatment have been regarded as antiscorbutic, antiseptic, balsamic, diuretic, expectorant, stimulant and tonic.

== Other considerations ==
As a hybrid, the tree does not breed true; it will also hybridize with other poplars in the area. Seeds must be sown within days of ripening in the spring or lose viability. It is sown on the surface or lightly covered in trays on a cold frame.

Despite the tree's fragrance, the wood is "soft, rather woolly in texture", and lacks odor or taste, and is of relatively low flammability. A rooting hormone has been collected by soaking its chopped up shoots in water for a day.
