= Poplar River (Lake Superior) =

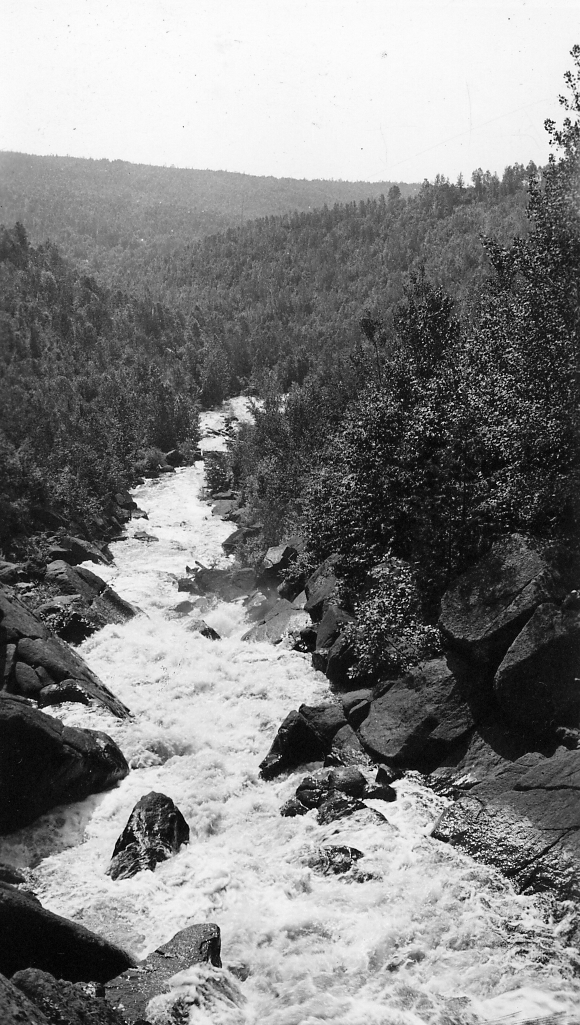
- Upper Poplar River Falls

- Mouth of the Poplar River
- Native name: Ga-manazadika Zibi (Ojibwe)

Location
- Country: United States
- State: Minnesota
- County: Cook County

Physical characteristics
- Source
  - location: Sawbill Camp, Gust Lake
  - coordinates: 47.8071156°N 90.7609616°W
- Mouth
  - location: Lutsen, Lake Superior
  - coordinates: 47.6357311°N 90.7073611°W
- Length: 21.7 miles (34.9 km)
- Basin size: 114 square miles (300 km^{2})

The Poplar River is a river in northeastern Minnesota that drains into Lake Superior.

== Name ==
The Poplar River derives its English name from a translation of its Ojibwe name. Joseph Gilfillan identified the Ojibwe name of the Poplar River as Ga-manazadika Zibi, or "place-of-poplars river". Thomas Clark further identified the particular poplar in question as the Balm-of-Gilead.

== Topography ==
The Poplar River stretches 21.7 miles (34.9 km) from its source in Gust Lake to its mouth in Lutsen, where it empties into Lake Superior. Its major tributaries are Mistletoe Creek, the Tait River, Caribou Creek, and Barker Creek. It drains an area of 114 square miles (300 km^{2}) lying mostly on the Superior Upland plateau. In its upper reaches, the plateau's slope has an average grade of only 1%, which increases to 4% as the Poplar approaches Superior. Due to the many lakes located in this largely flat watershed, Poplar, along with its neighbors the Temperance, Cross, and Cascade rivers, has a more stable flow and a warmer average water temperature. Three miles from its mouth, the Poplar goes over a series of waterfalls. The 2.2 miles (3.5 km) above the Highway 61 bridge at the mouth of the river are classified as class II-IV+(V) rapids.

The Poplar's flow has been modified in the past by dams. In the early 20th century, two dams were located 2.9 and 5.6 miles (4.7 and 9.0 km) above the mouth of the river. In 1923, another dam was installed to power the nearby township of Lutsen, the only hydropower plant on a North Shore stream.

The watershed is 77% forested and 19% wetland, with the remainder being grassland, open water, agricultural land, or bare rock. There are 132 miles (212 km) of streams in the Poplar River watershed, and 87.6 miles (141.0 km) of road.

== Plant and animal life ==
The lower stretch of the Poplar River serves as a fishery for pink, chinook, and coho salmon in the spring, and rainbow and brook trout in the fall. The largest chinook salmon caught on record in Minnesota was taken here in 1989. 400 feet (120 m) from its mouth, a barrier waterfall prevents Lake Superior fish from traveling any further upstream. Brook trout can be found anywhere in the upper 17 miles of the Poplar, in increasing numbers as one moves further north. In the lower portions, spawning grounds for brook trout are limited by a recent buildup in silt, and warm water temperatures in the summer are stressful on the population. The populations of warmwater species such as smallmouth bass, pumpkinseed sunfish, and bluegill have been increasing in these regions over recent surveys. In the upper watershed of the Poplar, the smallmouth bass has spread into every major lake north of Rice Lake since being introduced into Crescent Lake in the 1990s.

== Logging ==
During the late 19th and early 20th century, logging was a major industry in the Arrowhead region of northern Minnesota. The Poplar, lying in a heavily forested area, was used to transport logs to Lake Superior from the inland forests. However, the Poplar, like neighboring streams with flat uplands and steep, narrow beds near their mouths, is not conducive to log driving. The Lutsen Tie & Post Company operated a sawmill upstream on Poplar River, and briefly operated a four-mile railroad linking that mill to Lockport between 1910 and 1912, but this was soon abandoned, and the locomotive sat on the shore of Lake Superior for nearly 20 years until it was sold for scrap metal.

Limited logging continues to the present day, largely on private land. The watershed of the Poplar River still sees less logging activity than other nearby watersheds.

== National Forest management ==
The United States Forest Service manages a rustic campground along the Poplar River. Rustic campgrounds in the Superior National Forest have no fees, but no drinking water or garbage disposal facilities. The Poplar River Rustic Campground has four sites designed for tents, but two have spurs long enough for RV use.

The campground is unusual in that it is located on the edge of a river rather than a lake. Several of the sites have access directly to the river making it very convenient for trout stream fishing. Note that trout fishing requires a trout/salmon stamp in addition to a valid Minnesota fishing license. This campground is also on one of the roads included in the USDA Forest Service Sawtooth Mountains Fall Color Tour, so it is good spot to stay during the fall color season.

== See also ==
- List of rivers of Minnesota
