= History of the United States Forest Service =

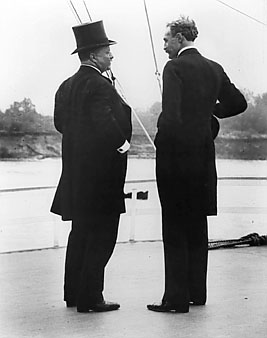
Gifford Pinchot (right) and Theodore Roosevelt shaped the early history of the Forest Service

Starting in 1876, and undergoing a series of name changes, the United States Forest Service of the Department of Agriculture grew to protect and use millions of acres of forest on public land. Gifford Pinchot, an early advocate of scientific forestry, along with President Theodore Roosevelt and conservation organizations, led the effort to manage forest for the public good.

From the 1890s to the present, there has been a fierce rivalry over control of forests between the Department of Agriculture and the Department of the Interior. Numerous proposals have failed and the Forest Service remains a part of the Department of Agriculture.

== History ==
In 1876, Congress created the office of Special Agent in the Department of Agriculture to assess the state of the forests in the United States. Franklin B. Hough was appointed the head of the office. In 1881, the office was expanded into the newly formed Division of Forestry. The Forest Reserve Act of 1891 authorized withdrawing land from the public domain as "forest reserves," managed by the Department of the Interior. In 1901, the Division of Forestry was renamed the Bureau of Forestry. The Transfer Act of 1905 transferred the management of forest reserves from the United States General Land Office of the Interior Department to the Bureau of Forestry, henceforth known as the US Forest Service. Gifford Pinchot was the first Chief Forester of the US Forest Service. In 1911, Congress passed the Weeks Act, authorizing the government to purchase private lands for stream-flow protection, and to maintain the lands as national forests. This made it possible for the national forest system to expand into the eastern United States.

== Timeline ==
- 1876 The Office of Special Agent for forest research is created in the Department of Agriculture to assess the state of the forests in the United States.
- 1881 The Office of the Special Agent is expanded into the newly formed Division of Forestry.
- 1891 The Forest Reserve Act of 1891 authorizes withdrawing land from the public domain as "forest reserves," managed by the Department of the Interior.
- 1901 The Division of Forestry is renamed the Bureau of Forestry.
- 1905 The Transfer Act of 1905 transfers the management of forest reserves from the General Land Office (within the Department of the Interior) to the Bureau of Forestry (within the Department of Agriculture). The name of the agency changes to the Forest Service.
- 1905–1945 National forest management focuses on protecting lands against overgrazing, controlling and combating fire, protecting fish and game, and providing public recreation.
- 1910 The Great Fire of 1910
- 1911 The Weeks Act authorized the Secretary of Agriculture to purchase cutover, denuded, and other forested lands for flood and fire control. This new authority led to the expansion of National Forests in the Eastern United States and the protection and restoration of millions of acres of land.
- 1922 The General Land Exchange Act of 1922 authorized the Secretary of Interior to obtain title to privately owned land located within national forest boundaries.
- 1944 The Forest Service begins a campaign stating "Only YOU can prevent forest fires" using a fire-injured bear as a symbol to be careful. Today, Smokey Bear is one of the most widely recognized icons in America.
- 1946–1960 National forests experience increased demand on forest resources, especially timber and recreation.
- 1960–1980 in response to shifting public values, the Forest Service shifts focus to managing land as integrated systems, instead of individual resources.
- 1989 The Chief 's New Perspectives initiative stresses ecosystem management and sustainability and is aimed to place timber management in line with other forest values including biodiversity, water quality, and recreation.
- 2001 The National Fire Plan is created to address the buildup of fuels caused by decades of fire suppression, climate change, and developments adjacent to forests.
- 2026, President Donald Trump announced his plans to move the Forest Service's headquarters from Washington D.C. to Salt Lake City, Utah, and to close research facilities in 31 states.

== Major legislation ==
A number of federal statutes govern the United States Forest Service:

- Forest Reserve Act of 1891 (March 3, 1891) (Section 24 of the General Land Law Revision Act of 1891, also known as the Creative Act; 26 Stat. 1103; 16 U.S.C. §§ 471, repealed 1976 by P.L. 94-579, FLPMA). This act gave the President authority to establish forest reserves from public domain lands. The forest reserves, then comprising 63 million acres (250,000 km^{2}), formed the foundation of the National Forest System. In February 1905, Congress transferred the Forest Reserves from the Department of the Interior to the Department of Agriculture. In July 1905, the Bureau of Forestry was renamed the Forest Service.
- Forest Service Organic Administration Act (June 4, 1897) (16 U.S.C. §§ 473–478, 479-482 and 551, June 4, 1897, as amended 1905, 1911, 1925, 1962, 1964, 1968, and 1976). This act is the original organic act governing the administration of national forest lands. The act specified the purposes for which forest reserves might be established and provided for their protection and management. Today, this act is one of several Federal laws under which the Forest Service operates. While the Organic Administration Act remains significant, it must be read in conjunction with the later acts, which expand the purpose and uses of the national forests.
- Multiple Use - Sustained Yield Act of 1960 (June 12, 1960) (P.L. 86-517; 16 U.S.C. §§ 528–531). This act declares that the purposes of the national forests include outdoor recreation, range, timber, watershed, and fish and wildlife. The act directs the Secretary of Agriculture to administer national forest renewable surface resources for multiple use and sustained yield. The act does not affect the jurisdiction or responsibilities of the States, the use or administration of the mineral resources of national forest lands, or the use or administration of Federal lands not within the national forests.
- National Environmental Policy Act (January 1, 1970) (P.L. 91–190; 42 U.S.C. §§ 4321–4347). This act requires Federal agencies to integrate environmental values into their decisionmaking processes by considering the environmental impacts of their proposed actions and reasonable alternatives to those actions. To meet this requirement, Federal agencies must analyze the environmental effects of proposed actions, such as through an environmental impact statement or other method, as specified in applicable rules. The act also established the President's Council on Environmental Quality.
- Endangered Species Act (December 28, 1973) (16 USC 1531–36, 1538–40). This act governs the process of identifying threatened and endangered species, provides protections for such species, and governs Federal actions that could affect such species or their habitat.
- Forest and Rangeland Renewable Resources Planning Act of 1974 (August 17, 1974) (P.L. 93-348, 88 Stat. 476, as amended; 16 U.S.C §§ 1600(note), 1600–1614). This act requires preparation of a strategic plan for all Forest Service activities every 5 years based on an assessment of renewable natural resources on all land ownerships every 10 years.
- National Forest Management Act of 1976 (October 22, 1976) (P.L. 94-588; 16 U.S.C. §§ 1600–1614, August 17, 1974, as amended 1976, 1978, 1980, 1981, 1983, 1985, 1988 and 1990). This act reorganized, expanded, and otherwise amended the Forest and Rangeland Renewable Resources Planning Act of 1974, which called for the management of renewable resources on national forest lands. The National Forest Management Act requires the Secretary of Agriculture to assess forest lands, develop a management program based on multiple-use, sustained-yield principles, and implement a resource management plan for each unit of the National Forest System. It is the primary statute governing the administration of national forests.
- Cooperative Forestry Assistance Act of 1978 (July 1, 1978) (P.L. 95-313; 16 U.S.C. §§ 2101–2111, July 1, 1978, as amended 1990, 1991, 1992, 1996 and 2008). This act, as amended, authorizes the State and private forestry activities of the Forest Service—including fire, forest management, forest health, wood utilization, urban and community forestry, forest land easements, and organizational management assistance—to State forestry agencies.
- Forest and Rangeland Renewable Resources Research Act of 1978 (June 30, 1978) (P.L. 95-307, as amended by P.L. 100–521, Forest Ecosystems and Atmospheric Pollution Research Act of 1988, Section 3 (c), and as amended by P.L. 101–624, Food Agriculture, Conservation, and Trade Act of 1990 (Farm Bill), Title XII, Subtitle B; 16 U.S.C. §§ 1641–1648). The act provides an updated and expanded authority for research by the Forest Service, including allowing competitive grants, performing research studies, recycling wood fiber, conducting tests, and establishing a forestry student grant program for minority and female students.
- Foreign Operation Appropriations Act of 1978 (November 5, 1990) (P.L. 101–513, 104 Stat. 2070; 16 §§ U.S.C. 4501 note, 4501, 4502, 4503, 4503a to 4503d, 4504, 4505, 1641, 1643, 2101, 2109). Title VI of this act provides authority for international forestry activities of the Forest Service.
- Food, Conservation, and Energy Act of 2008 (Farm Bill) (P.L. 110–234) The Farm Bill is passed every several years and deals with both agriculture and all other affairs under the purview of the U.S. Department of Agriculture. The most recent act, P.L. 110–234, contains new authorities for the Forest Service:
  - Title VIII: Forestry
    - Subtitle A: Amendment to the Cooperative Forestry Assistance Act of 1978. Establishes national priorities for private forest conservation, a community forest and open space conservation program, and a Secretary level Forest Resources Coordinating Committee.
    - Subtitle B: Cultural and Heritage Cooperation Authority. Authorizes the reburial of Indian tribal human remains and cultural items found on national forest lands and temporary closure of national forest lands for cultural purposes.
    - Subtitle C. Amendments to Other Forestry Related Laws. Amends the Lacey Act to include the illegal taking of plants, establishes an Emergency Forest Restoration Program, and renews authority and funding for the Healthy Forest Reserve Program.
  - Title IX: Energy Establishes Forest Biomass for Energy and Community Wood Energy grant programs.

The following are additional laws with significant influence on the mission of the Forest Service:

- Transfer Act of 1905 (February 1, 1905) (P.L. 58–33, Ch. 288, 33 Stat. 628; 16 §§ U.S.C. 472, 554). This act transferred administration of the forest reserves from the Department of the Interior to the Department of Agriculture.
- Weeks Act (March 1, 1911) (P.L. 61-435, CH. 186, 36 Stat. 961, as amended; 16 U.S.C. §§ 480, 500, 515, 516, 517, 517a, 518, 519, 521, 552, 563). This act authorized the Secretary of Agriculture to examine, locate, and purchase forested, cutover, or denuded lands within the watersheds of navigable streams necessary to regulate the flow of navigable streams or for timber production.
- Clean Water Act (Federal Water Pollution Control Act) (June 30, 1948) (P.L. 80-845; 33 U.S.C. §§ 1251–1387, October 18, 1972, as amended 1973–1983, 1987, 1988, 1990–1992, 1994, 1995, and 1996). This act is a comprehensive statute aimed at restoring and maintaining the chemical, physical, and biological integrity of the Nation's waters.
- Clean Air Act (July 14, 1955) (P.L. 84–159; 42 U.S.C. §§ 7401–7602). This act was the first Federal legislation involving air pollution. This act provided funds for Federal research in air pollution. Major amendments were made to this act by P.L. 88-206 and P.L. 95–95 to help control air pollution and increase the authority and responsibility of the Federal Government to help provide clean air.
- Wilderness Act (September 3, 1964) (P.L. 88-577, 78 Stat. 890 as amended; 16 U.S.C §§ 1131 (note), 1131–1136). This act established the National Wilderness Preservation System and designated the initial components of that system. These lands are to be administered for the use and enjoyment of the American people and for the preservation of their wilderness character.
- Land and Water Conservation Fund Act of 1965 (September 3, 1964) (P.L. 88-578, 78 Stat. 897 as amended; 16 U.S.C. §§ 460l-4 through 6a, 460l-7 through 460l-10, 460l-10a-d, 460l-11). This act provides money to Federal, State, and local governments to purchase land, water, and wetlands. Land is bought from landowners at fair-market value, unless donated.
- Wild and Scenic Rivers Act (October 2, 1968) (P.L. 90-542, 82 Stat. 906, as amended; 16 U.S.C. §§ 1271(note), 1271–1287). This act established a National Wild and Scenic Rivers System to include rivers possessing "outstandingly remarkable" values to be preserved in free-flowing condition. The act designated the initial components of this system and prescribed how future additions to the system would be evaluated.
- Federal Advisory Committee Act (October 6, 1972) (P.L. 92-463; 5 U.S.C. §§ Appendix 2). The act governs the behavior of approximately 1,000 Federal advisory committees. In particular, the act restricts the formation of such committees to only those that are deemed essential and limits their powers to provision of advice to officers and agencies in the executive branch of the Federal Government. The act requires that administrative procedures and hearings be public knowledge.
- Federal Land Policy and Management Act, (October 21, 1976) (43 USC 1701–2, 1711–23, 1732–37, 1740–42, 1744, 1746–48, 1751–53, 1761–71, 1781–82). This statute provides the basic policies for Federal land management and governs actions such as acquisitions, sales, exchanges, withdrawals, and rights of way.
- Secure Rural Schools and Community Self-Determination Act of 2000, Section 601, Division C, of P.L. 110-343 (Emergency Economic Stabilization Act of 2008). The legislation provides financial assistance to rural counties affected by the decline in revenue from timber harvests in Federal lands. Funds are used for schools and roads, as well as to create employment opportunities, to maintain current infrastructure, and to improve the health of watersheds and ecosystems. More than $2.1 billion will be distributed to eligible States and counties over a 4-year period (FY 2008–2011).

== List of Forest Service chiefs ==
The following persons served as chief of the Forest Service:

No.	Image	Forest Service Chief Foresters	Term start	Term end	Education	Refs.
Chiefs of the Division of Forestry
1		Franklin B. Hough (Note: Dr. Franklin B. Hough was originally given the title of "Forestry Agent" in 1876. In 1881 the title was changed to "Chief". When Pinchot became Chief of the Division, he requested that his title be changed from "Chief" to "Forester". The title "Chief Forester" was adopted in 1935.)	1876	1883	Union College, Western Reserve College	
2		Nathaniel H. Egleston	1883	1886	Yale University, Yale Divinity School	
3		Bernhard Eduard Fernow	1886	1898	University of Königsberg; Prussian Forest Academy at Münden	
4		Gifford Pinchot	1898	1901	Yale University	
Chief of the Bureau of Forestry
1		Gifford Pinchot	1901	1905	Yale University	
Chiefs of the U.S. Forest Service
1		Gifford Pinchot	1905	1910	Yale University	
2		Henry "Harry" Solon Graves	1910	1920	Yale University	
3		William B. Greeley	1920	1928	University of California & Yale Forestry School	
4		Robert Y. Stuart	1928	1933	Dickinson College & Yale Forestry School	
5		Ferdinand A. Silcox	1933	1939 (Note: Died in office.)	College of Charleston & Yale Forestry School	
6		Earle H. Clapp (acting)	1939	1943	University of Michigan	
7		Lyle F. Watts	1943	1952	Iowa State College & Forestry School	
8		Richard E. McArdle	1952	1962	University of Michigan	
9		Edward P. Cliff	1962	1972	Utah State College	
10		John R. McGuire	1972	1979	University of Minnesota & Yale Forestry School	
11		R. Max Peterson	1979	1987	University of Missouri	
12		F. Dale Robertson	January 1987	October 28, 1993	University of Arkansas	
13		Jack Ward Thomas	December 1, 1993	November 1996	Texas A&M University, West Virginia University, University of Massachusetts	
acting		Michael Dombeck	December 21, 1996	January 7, 1997	University of Wisconsin–Stevens Point and the University of Minnesota	
14		Michael Dombeck	January 7, 1997	March 31, 2001	University of Wisconsin–Stevens Point and the University of Minnesota	
15		Dale N. Bosworth	April 12, 2001	February 2, 2007	University of Idaho	
16		Gail Kimbell	February 5, 2007	June 17, 2009	University of Vermont, Oregon State University	
17		Thomas Tidwell	June 17, 2009	September 1, 2017	Washington State University	
18		Tony Tooke	September 1, 2017	March 8, 2018	Mississippi State University	
acting		Vicki Christiansen	March 8, 2018	October 11, 2018	University of Washington	
19		Vicki Christiansen	October 11, 2018	July 26, 2021	University of Washington	
20		Randy Moore	July 26, 2021	March 2, 2025	Southern University	
21		Tom Schultz	March 3, 2025	Present	University of Virginia, University of Wyoming, University of Montana	

Table notes:

== See also ==
- Environmental history of the United States
- List of national forests of the United States

== Notes ==
- Bergoffen, William W. (1976). 100 Years of Federal Forestry (PDF). U.S. Department of Agriculture. Archived (PDF) from the original on January 8, 2018.
- Calkin, David E., et al. "Forest Service large fire area burned and suppression expenditure trends, 1970–2002." Journal of Forestry 103.4 (2005): 179–183. online Archived March 25, 2025, at the Wayback Machine
- Clary, David A. Timber and the forest service (University Press of Kansas, 1988).
- Egan, Timothy (2009). The Big Burn: Teddy Roosevelt & the Fire That Saved America.
- Frome, Michael. (1984)The Forest Service (Westview Press)
- Hall, William L. (July 1914). "To Remake The Appalachians: A New Order In The Mountains That is Founded On Forestry – What The Government's Appalachian Forests Mean To The People In The Mountains And To The Millions Who Want Recreation". The World's Work: A History of Our Time. XLIV (2): 321–338.
- Hays, Samuel P. Wars in the Woods: The Rise of Ecological Forestry in America (2006) online
- Hays, Samuel P. The American People and the National Forests: The First Century of the U.S. Forest Service (2009), history by a leading scholar online
- Knappen, Theodore M. (May 1922). "Shall Our Forests Be "Developed" Or Renewed?". The World's Work: A History of Our Time. XLIV: 78–88.
- Polenberg, Richard. "The Great Conservation Contest" Forest History Newsletter (1967) 10 (4): 13–23. online
- Robinson, Glen O. (2013) The Forest Service: A study in public land management (RFF Press, 2013).
- Steen, Harold K. (2013) The US forest service: A centennial history (U of Washington Press, 2013).
- Stephens, Scott L. "Forest fire causes and extent on United States Forest Service lands." International Journal of Wildland Fire 14.3 (2005): 213–222. online Archived March 14, 2024, at the Wayback Machine
- Thomas, Jack Ward. (1996) "Forest Service perspective on ecosystem management." Ecological Applications 6.3 (1996): 703–705. online
- Williams, Gerald W. (2000) The USDA Forest Service: the first century (USDA Forest Service, 2000) online.
