= Robert Y. Stuart =

American forester (1883–1933)

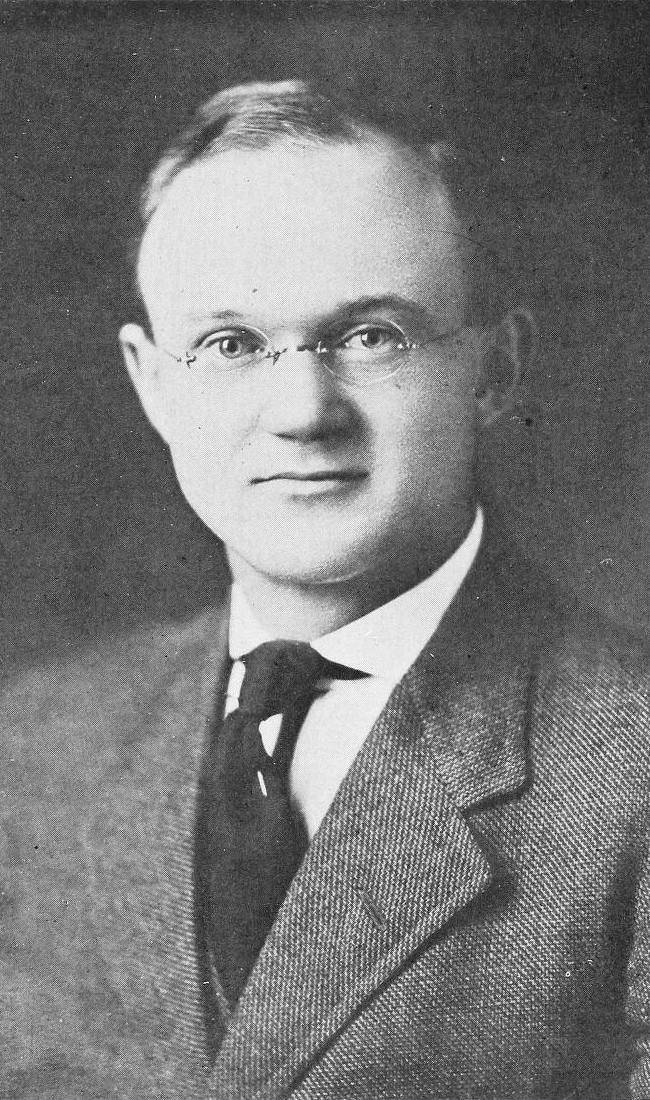

4th Chief of the United States Forest Service
- In office May 1, 1928 – October 23, 1933
- President: Calvin Coolidge; Herbert Hoover; Franklin D. Roosevelt
- Preceded by: William B. Greeley
- Succeeded by: Ferdinand A. Silcox

Personal details
- Born: February 13, 1883 Cumberland County, Pennsylvania
- Died: October 23, 1933 (aged 50) Washington, D.C.
- Spouse: Janet M.A. Wilson
- Education: Dickinson College; Yale University
- Occupation: Forester
- Awards: Fellow, Society of American Foresters (1930)

Robert Young Stuart (1883–1933) was the fourth Chief of the United States Forest Service (USFS) of the Department of Agriculture, and was appointed on May 1, 1928, succeeding William B. Greeley. He served as Chief until his death on October 23, 1933.

== Early life and education ==
Robert Young Stuart was born February 13, 1883, on a farm in Cumberland County, Pennsylvania. He earned B.A. and M.A. degrees at Dickinson College in Carlisle, and a M.F. degree from Yale University in 1906.

== Career ==
In 1906 Stuart began working for the U.S. Forest Service in the Northern Rocky Mountain District where he became Assistant District Forester in charge of operation and then silviculture, which included timber sales and planting. In November 1912 he moved to Washington, DC to serve as assistant chief of silviculture.

During World War I he spent two years overseas, from September 1917 to June 1919, under William B. Greeley with the Tenth and Twentieth (Forestry) Engineer Regiments in France. He was promoted to Major on October 1, 1918, with assignment to general headquarters at Chaumont. On February 19, 1919, he became commanding officer of the 5th Battalion of the 20th (Forest) Engineers and district commander of the forest troops in the Gien District. For his services with the American Expeditionary Force he received a citation from General John J. Pershing.

In 1920 he accepted the post of Deputy Commissioner of Forestry in Pennsylvania, serving under Gifford Pinchot and then becoming Commissioner of Forestry in 1922 when Pinchot became Governor.

Early in 1927 Stuart rejoined the Forest Service as Assistant Forester in charge of public relations, and was promoted to Chief a year later when William B. Greeley resigned. Stuart officially became the 4th Chief of the Forest Service on May 1, 1928.

During the early years of the Great Depression, Stuart led the Forest Service in creating job opportunities for the unemployed on the national forests, including guiding the forestry work of the Civilian Conservation Corps. He also oversaw the McSweeney-McNary Act of 1928 promoting forest research, and the Knutson-Vandenburg Act of 1930 expanding tree planting on the national forests.

== Personal life ==
Stuart married Janet M.A. Wilson of Harrisburg, Pennsylvania, in 1907. They had two children, Janet Crichton and Helen Stuart.

Stuart was killed by an accidental fall from a seventh floor window of the Atlantic Building, the Washington DC headquarters of the Forest Service, on the morning of October 23, 1933.

In March 1934 the forest tree nursery on the Kisatchie National Forest in Louisiana was named by the Forest Service in his honor.

== See also ==
- United States Chief Foresters

Political offices
Preceded by William B. Greeley	Chief of the United States Forest Service; 1928–1933	Succeeded by Ferdinand A. Silcox
