= Earle H. Clapp =

American forester

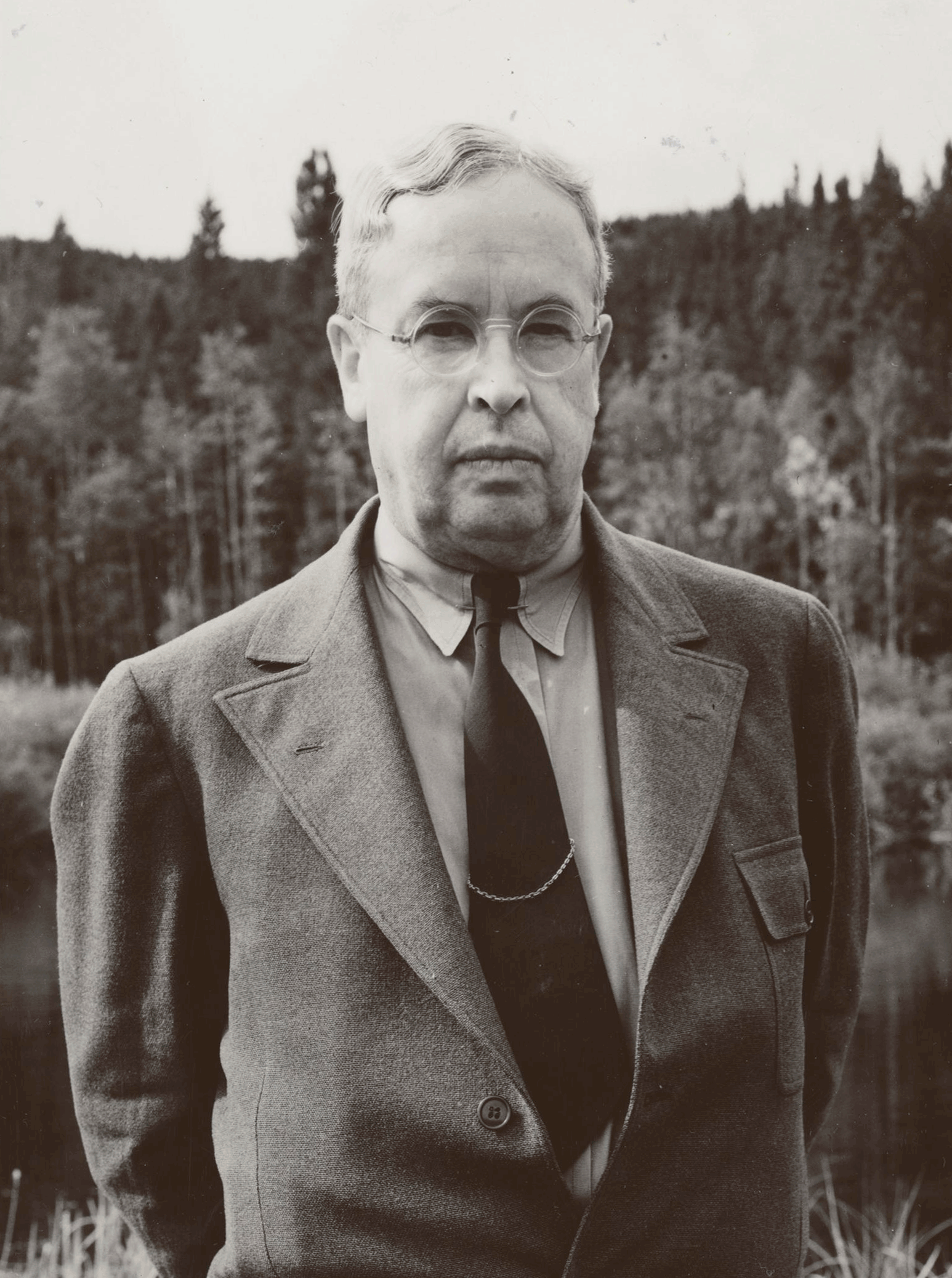
- Clapp in 1941

Acting Chief of the United States Forest Service
- In office December 21, 1939 – January 8, 1943
- President: Franklin D. Roosevelt
- Preceded by: Ferdinand A. Silcox
- Succeeded by: Lyle F. Watts

Personal details
- Born: October 15, 1877 North Rush, New York
- Died: July 2, 1970 (aged 92) Washington, D.C.
- Education: University of Michigan
- Occupation: Forester
- Awards: Fellow, Society of American Foresters (1930); Gifford Pinchot Medal, Society of American Foresters (1960)

Earle H. Clapp (October 15, 1877 – July 2, 1970) was an American forester who served as acting Chief of the United States Forest Service (USFS) of the Department of Agriculture, from December 21, 1939, to January 8, 1943, when Lyle F. Watts was appointed chief.

== Early life and education ==
Earle Hart Clapp was born in North Rush, New York, on October 15, 1877. He attended Cornell University for two years, graduating from the University of Michigan in 1905 with an A.B. degree in Forestry.

== Career ==
Clapp began working for the Forest Service in 1905, serving in various capacities, such as timber sales in Wyoming and Montana. He also served as a forest inspector in the Washington DC office. In 1915, Chief Henry S. Graves created the Division of Research and placed Clapp in charge as Assistant Chief. For the next 20 years Clapp guided the research effort and established most of the agency's research facilities.

In 1935 Clapp left the research program to become Associate Chief. When Ferdinand A. Silcox died in office on December 20, 1939, he was appointed Acting Chief.

Clapp was never officially chief of the agency, as President Roosevelt did not want to approve the appointment. Roosevelt supported reorganizing and transferring the Forest Service to a new Department of Natural Resources. Clapp served in this capacity until Lyle Watts was appointed Chief in 1943.

Clapp died in Washington DC on July 2, 1970.

== See also ==
- United States Chief Foresters

Political offices
Preceded by Ferdinand A. Silcox	Chief of the United States Forest Service; 1939–1943	Succeeded by Lyle F. Watts
