= List of Xi Sigma Pi chapters =

Xi Sigma Pi is a North American honor society for forestry and related sciences. In the following list, active chapters are noted in bold and inactive chapters are in italics.

Chapter	Charter date and range	Institution	Location	Status	Ref.
Alpha	November 24, 1908 – 20xx ?	University of Washington	Seattle, Washington	Inactive	
**Beta**	1916	Michigan State University	East Lansing, Michigan	Active	
**Gamma**	1917	University of Maine	Orono, Maine	Active	
**Delta**	1920	University of Minnesota	Minneapolis, Minnesota	Active	
**Epsilon**	1920	University of Idaho	Moscow, Idaho	Active	
**Zeta**	1921	Oregon State University	Corvallis, Oregon	Active	
Eta	1924–2017	Pennsylvania State University	State College, Pennsylvania	Inactive	
**Theta**	1924	University of California, Berkeley	Berkeley, California	Active	
Iota	1927–1929	Penn State Forest Academy	Mont Alto, Pennsylvania	Inactive	
Kappa	1934–2019	Purdue University	West Lafayette, Indiana	Inactive	
**Lambda**	1939	Utah State University	Logan, Utah	Active	
**Mu**	1940	North Carolina State University	Raleigh, North Carolina	Active	
**Nu**	1940	Louisiana State University	Baton Rouge, Louisiana	Active	
**Xi**	1941	University of Georgia	Athens, Georgia	Active	
**Omicron**	1943	Colorado State University	Fort Collins, Colorado	Active	
**Pi**	1948	University of Florida	Gainesville, Florida	Active	
**Rho**	1952	West Virginia University	Morgantown, West Virginia	Active	
**Sigma**	1952	Auburn University	Auburn, Alabama	Active	
Tau	1952–2017	University of Missouri	Columbia, Missouri	Inactive	
Upsilon	1958–2017	University of Michigan	Ann Arbor, Michigan	Inactive	
Phi	1960–202x ?	University of Montana	Missoula, Montana	Inactive	
**Chi**	1962	Virginia Tech	Blacksburg, Virginia	Active	
Psi	1962–202x ?	University of Massachusetts Amherst	Amherst, MA	Inactive	
**Omega**	1964	Southern Illinois University Carbondale	Carbondale, Illinois	Active	
**Alpha Alpha**	1965	University of Illinois Urbana-Champaign	Urbana, Illinois	Active	
**Alpha Beta**	1965	Clemson University	Clemson, South Carolina	Active	
**Alpha Gamma**	1965	Iowa State University	Ames, Iowa	Active	
**Alpha Delta**	1966	Washington State University	Pullman, Washington	Active	
**Alpha Epsilon**	1966	University of New Hampshire	Durham, New Hampshire	Active	
**Alpha Zeta**	1968	Stephen F. Austin State University	Nacogdoches, Texas	Active	
**Alpha Eta**	1971	Michigan Technological University	Houghton, Michigan	Active	
**Alpha Theta**	1971	Mississippi State University	Starkville, Mississippi	Active	
Alpha Iota				Unassigned	
**Alpha Kappa**	1972	University of Tennessee	Knoxville, Tennessee	Active	
**Alpha Lambda**	1973	California State Polytechnic University, Humboldt	Arcata, California	Active	
**Alpha Mu**	1973	Oklahoma State University	Stillwater, Oklahoma	Active	
Alpha Nu	1974–2017	University of Wisconsin–Madison	Madison, Wisconsin	Inactive	
**Alpha Xi**	1975	University of Wisconsin–Stevens Point	Stevens Point, Wisconsin	Active	
**Alpha Omicron**	1975	University of Vermont	Burlington, Vermont	Active	
**Alpha Pi**	1975	Northern Arizona University	Flagstaff, Arizona	Active	
Alpha Rho	1976	University of Kentucky	Lexington, Kentucky	Inactive	
Alpha Sigma	1978–2017	Texas A&M University	College Station, Texas	Inactive	
Alpha Tau	1980–1996	University of Alberta	Edmonton, Alberta, Canada	Inactive	
**Alpha Upsilon**	1980	California Polytechnic State University, San Luis Obispo	San Luis Obispo, California	Active	
**Alpha Phi**	1993	Louisiana Tech University	Ruston, Louisiana	Active	
**Alpha Chi**	1997	University of Arkansas at Monticello	Monticello, Arkansas	Active	
**Alpha Psi**	2019	Ohio State University	Columbus, Ohio	Active	
