= Richard E. McArdle =

8th Chief of United States Forest Service (1952-1962)

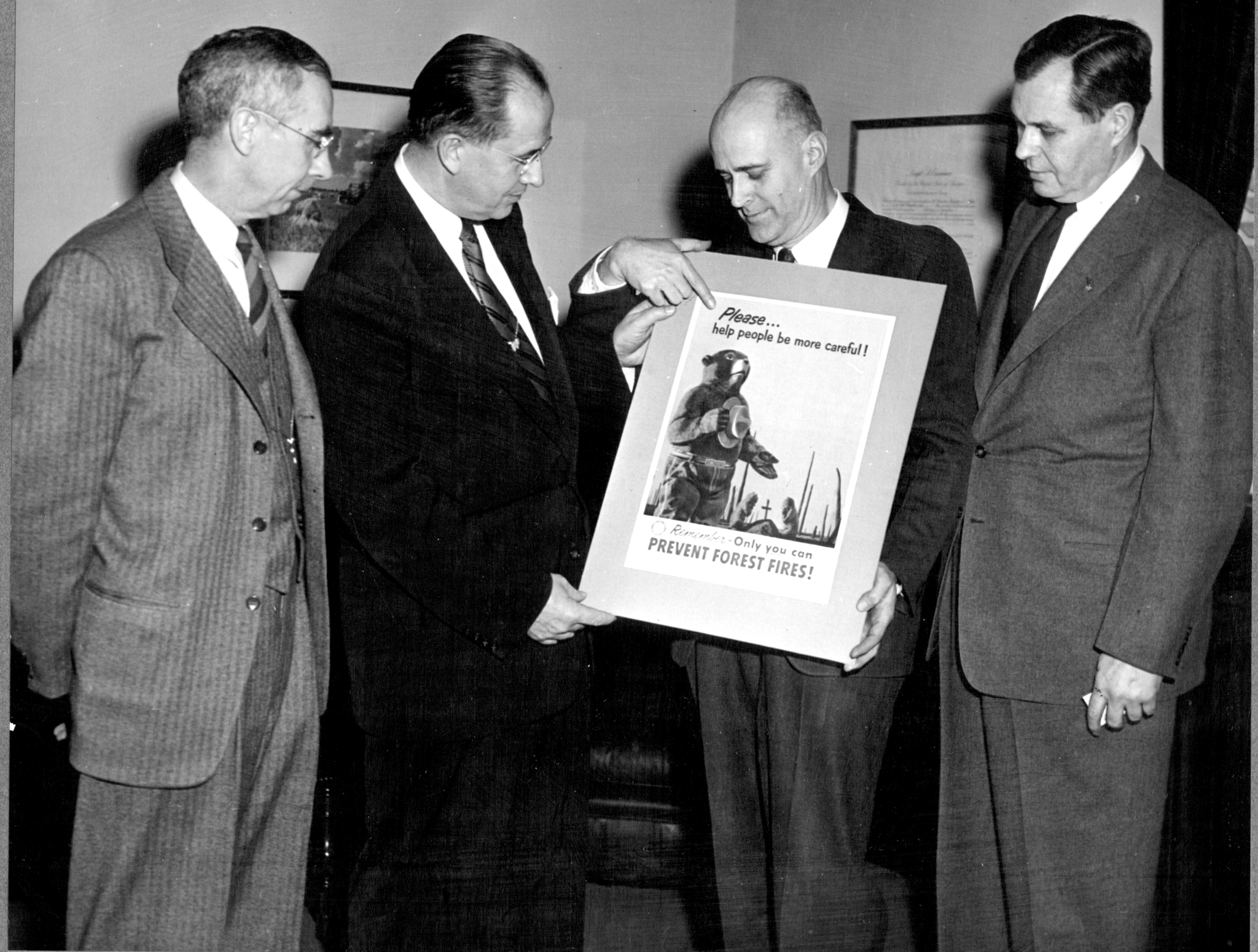

8th Chief of the United States Forest Service
- In office July 1, 1952 – March 17, 1962
- President: Harry S. Truman; Dwight D. Eisenhower; John F. Kennedy
- Preceded by: Lyle F. Watts
- Succeeded by: Edward P. Cliff

Personal details
- Born: February 25, 1899 Lexington, Kentucky
- Died: October 4, 1983 (aged 84) Washington, D.C.
- Spouse: Dorothy Coppage
- Education: University of Michigan
- Occupation: Forester
- Awards: President's Award for Distinguished Federal Civilian Service (1961); Knight Commander's Cross Order of Merit of the Federal Republic of Germany; USDA Distinguished Service Award; Rockefeller Public Service Award; Silver Buffalo Award

Richard E. McArdle (February 25, 1899 – October 4, 1983) served as the eighth Chief of the United States Forest Service (USFS) of the Department of Agriculture, from July 1, 1952 to March 17, 1962.

== Early life and education ==
Richard Edwin McArdle was born on February 25, 1899, in Lexington, Kentucky. He earned his B.S., M.S., and Ph.D degrees in forestry in 1923, 1924, and 1930, respectively, at the University of Michigan.

== Career ==
He entered the Forest Service in 1924 as a silviculturist working out of the Pacific Northwest Forest Experiment Station in Portland, Oregon. In 1934 he was named dean of the school of forestry at the University of Idaho. A year later he returned to the Forest Service to become Director of the Rocky Mountain Experiment Station at Fort Collins, Colorado. Three years later he moved to the Appalachian Station at Asheville, North Carolina. In 1944 he was brought to Washington, D.C. as Assistant Chief of the Forest Service, in charge of state and private forestry cooperation, a position he held until becoming chief. McArdle was officially named the eighth Chief of the Forest Service on July 1, 1952.

During his tenure he pushed for long-range plans on the national forests and in the research branch. Some results were the Multiple-Use Mining Law of 1955, and the influential Multiple-Use Sustained-Yield Act of 1960 which established policy for the development and administration of the national forests in the public interest. During his time as Chief, the Forest Service was assigned the management of seven million acres of western plains lands, which they organized as national grasslands.

McArdle was also active in international forestry, founding the North American Forestry Commission, and helping to organize and serve as president of the Fifth World Forestry Congress in Seattle, Washington, in 1960.

On January 11, 1961, McArdle received the President's Gold Medal Award for distinguished federal civilian service. The award was presented to McArdle at the White House by President Dwight D. Eisenhower.

On November 13, 1962, in a ceremony at the German Embassy in Washington, D.C., McArdle was awarded the Knight Commander's Cross of the Order of Merit of the Federal Republic of Germany by German Ambassador Karl Heinrich Knappstein.

McArdle was also a recipient of the Department of Agriculture's Distinguished Service Award (1957), the Order of Merit for Forestry awarded by the government of Mexico (1961), the Rockefeller Public Service Award (1960), the John Aston Warder Medal from the American Forestry Association (1978), the American Forestry Association's Distinguished Service Award for Conservation, the Sir William Schlich Memorial Medal of the Society of American Foresters (1962), the Career Service Award of the National Civil Service League, the Award for Merit of the Public Personnel Association, the Silver Buffalo Award of the Boy Scouts of America, and the New York State College of Forestry Gold Medal for Distinguished Service.

McArdle's retirement from the Forest Service was publicly announced on March 9, 1962, effective March 17. Following retirement from the Forest Service, McArdle then spent two years as executive director of the National Institute of Public Affairs.

McArdle died of a heart attack on October 4, 1983, at George Washington University Hospital.

== See also ==
- United States Chief Foresters

Political offices
Preceded by Lyle F. Watts	Chief of the United States Forest Service; 1952–1962	Succeeded by Edward P. Cliff
