= Ferdinand A. Silcox =

United States Forest Service official

5th Chief of the United States Forest Service
- In office November 15, 1933 – December 20, 1939
- President: Franklin D. Roosevelt
- Preceded by: Robert Y. Stuart
- Succeeded by: Earle H. Clapp

Personal details
- Born: December 25, 1882 Columbus, Georgia
- Died: December 20, 1939 (aged 56) Alexandria, Virginia
- Education: College of Charleston; Yale University
- Occupation: Forester

Ferdinand Augustus Silcox (December 25, 1882 – December 20, 1939) was the fifth Chief of the United States Forest Service (USFS) of the Department of Agriculture, and was appointed on November 15, 1933, succeeding Robert Y. Stuart. He served as Chief until his death on December 20, 1939.

== Early life and education ==
Ferdinand Augustus Silcox was born in Columbus, Georgia, on December 25, 1882. He graduated from College of Charleston in South Carolina in 1903 with a B.S. degree with honors in chemistry and sociology. He then studied at the Yale School of Forestry, graduating in 1905 with the degree of Master of Forestry.

== Career ==
In 1905, he entered the Forest Service as a ranger and was assigned to duty in Colorado. Following rapid advancements to posts of acting forest supervisor and forest inspector for the western states, Silcox in 1908 became associate district forester at Missoula, Montana. Three years later, he was appointed district forester at Missoula, serving there until 1917.

During World War I he was commissioned as captain in the 20th Engineers (Forestry) and later promoted to the rank of major. Later, he was selected to handle labor problems at the shipyards in the Puget Sound and Columbia River districts. After the war, Silcox worked in the private sector for eleven years as a director of industrial relations before being appointed as chief.

Following the death of Robert Y. Stuart, Silcox was appointed Chief of the Forest Service on November 15, 1933. As chief, Silcox proposed increased public ownership, public cooperation with private owners, and State or Federal cutting regulations on private lands. More funds from Congress to purchase land permitted the Forest Service to enlarge the National Forests, especially in the cut-over regions of the Lake States and South. He was also able to help unemployed workers deal with the Great Depression through the Civilian Conservation Corps (CCC) and Works Projects Administration (WPA) projects on the national forests.

Silcox died suddenly at his home in Alexandria, Virginia, on December 20, 1939. Following his death, Secretary of Agriculture Henry Wallace wrote: "The death of Mr. Silcox was a blow to the whole American movement for conservation of human and natural resources. His work is commemorated in a government organization of highest efficiency and esprit de corps and in the grateful remembrance of great service to many of the worthy civic enterprises that American citizens are carrying on today."

In 1943, the Liberty Ship SS Ferdinand A. Silcox was named for him.

== See also ==
- Silcox Hut
- United States Chief Foresters

Political offices
| Preceded by Robert Y. Stuart | Chief of the United States Forest Service; 1933–1939 | Succeeded by Earle H. Clapp |
