= Midnight forests =

Forests created by Theodore Roosevelt

Midnight forests was a nickname given to the forests created by President of the United States Theodore Roosevelt near the end of his term as president.

In early 1891, Congress was reconsidering provisions in the nation's land laws. An amendment (Section 24) attached to the legislation would allow the President to set aside forest reserves from the land in the public domain. The act, signed on March 3, 1891 by President Benjamin Harrison, was later referred to as the Creative Act, or the Forest Reserve Act.

Due to complaints from many special interest groups, ranging from cattlemen to loggers to sheepmen and homesteaders, over the myriad regulations required for operations in forest reserve lands, they, together with their political allies, managed to get enough support in Congress by 1907 to change the 1891 law.

Senator Charles W. Fulton of Oregon attached an amendment to the Agriculture Appropriations Act of 1907, which stated, "Hereafter no forest reserve shall be created, nor shall any addition be made to one heretofore created, within the limits of the States of Oregon, Washington, Idaho, Montana, Colorado or Wyoming." The amendment also changed the name of the forest reserves to national forests, in order to make it clear that the forests were to be used, not preserved. The bill passed on February 25, 1907, and was sent to the President for his signature.

Roosevelt had no way of vetoing the Agriculture Appropriations Act to which the amendment was attached without gaining more political enemies, and therefore had to sign it into law by noon on March 4, 1907. The president spent the next few days consulting with Gifford Pinchot, head of the U.S. Forest Service, about the areas to designate as national forest reserves. Numerous government clerks worked continuously to complete the paperwork necessary for Roosevelt to proclaim twenty-one new forest preserves and to enlarge eleven existing ones, of about 16,000,000 acres (65,000 km^{2}), which he did on March 1–2, 1907. After doing so, Roosevelt then signed the Agricultural Appropriations Act, which included the now-irrelevant amendment. "Roosevelt later gleefully recalled how opposing interests 'turned handsprings in their wrath' over the setting aside of these 'midnight reserves' – a stroke described by a Forest Service historian as 'the last flamboyant act of the conservation movement.'" During his administration, Roosevelt set aside 150 national forests, the first 51 federal bird reservations, five national parks, the first 18 national monuments, the first four national game preserves and the first 24 reclamation, or federal irrigation, projects; the national forests alone consisted of 150,000,000 acres (610,000 km^{2}) of land by the end of his term in 1909.

Because of the nature of the timing of the proclamations, and from Roosevelt's own comment, the forest preserves created in March 1907 are sometimes referred to as the "midnight forests".
