= Henry S. Graves =

American forester (1871–1951)

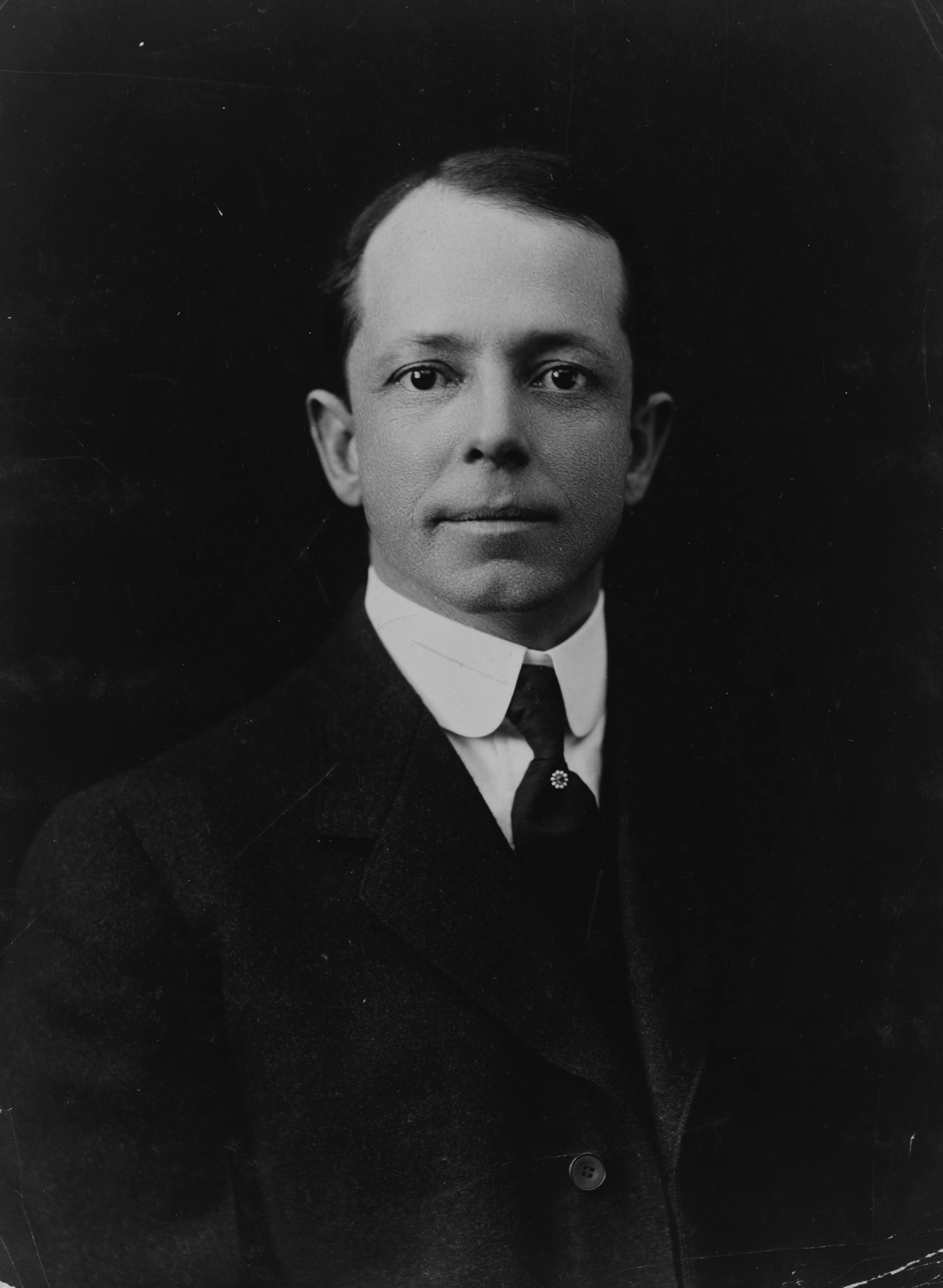

2nd Chief of the United States Forest Service
- In office February 1910 – March 1920
- President: William Howard Taft; Woodrow Wilson
- Preceded by: Gifford Pinchot
- Succeeded by: William B. Greeley

Personal details
- Born: May 3, 1871 Marietta, Ohio, U.S.
- Died: March 7, 1951 (aged 79) Brattleboro, Vermont, U.S.
- Education: Yale University
- Occupation: Forester

Henry Solon Graves (May 3, 1871 – March 7, 1951) was a forest administrator in the United States. He co-founded the Yale Forest School (now the Yale School of Forestry and Environmental Studies) in 1900, the oldest continuous forestry school in the United States. He was appointed Chief of the United States Forest Service in 1910 and served in this position until 1920.

== Biography ==
Graves was born in Marietta, Ohio. He attended Phillips Academy, Andover, graduating in 1888, and Yale University, graduating in 1892. He received a Master's degree from Yale in 1900. At Yale Graves was a member of the secret society Skull and Bones.

Graves, James Toumey and Gifford Pinchot established the Yale Forest School in 1900, the first graduate school dedicated to forestry in the United States. He served as its first Director [1900-1910] and returned as Dean of the forestry school [1923-1939]. Henry was the Provost of Yale University from 1923-1927. In 1900, he and Pinchot were also two of the seven founding members of the Society of American Foresters.

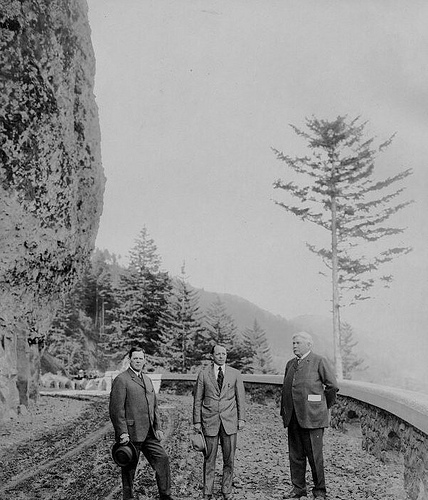
Henry S. Graves, C. C. Colt and Samuel Hill on the Columbia Ridge Highway, circa 1910

Graves was Chief of the United States Forest Service, from 1910 until 1920. Pinchot had served as the first Chief from the foundation of the Forest Service in 1905, but he was fired by President Howard Taft in 1910 for speaking out against Taft's environmental policies. As the leader of the Forest Service, Graves was considered very strict. During his ten-year term, Graves was faced with a lot of work. He had to try to restore the power that the Forest Service had before Pinchot was fired, and he also had to prove that his agency was the most qualified and best suited to control and manage the national forests, because many states wanted to manage their own forests.

Graves was commissioned as a major in the United States Army Corps of Engineers in 1917, during the First World War, and sent to France to prepare for the arrival of the 10th Engineers (Forestry) (later the 20th Engineers). He was promoted to lieutenant colonel and returned to the U.S. in 1918 and to the Forest Service. Later that year, he started a movement to help develop a National forest policy for the United States of America. Due to symptoms of "Meniere's Symbole", Graves resigned from his position as Chief Forester, completing his duties in 1920.

Following his retirement in 1939, Graves was able to dedicate more time in assisting his good friend, George Dudley Seymour with managing the Hale Homestead ('The Birthplace' of Nathan Hale) in Coventry, Connecticut. Both Henry Graves and George Cromie [Yale Forest School, 1911 and 1st Superintendent of Trees, City of New Haven, CT] provided technical forestry management assistance to George Dudley Seymour for the woodlands surrounding the Hale Homestead, which would become the Nathan Hale State Forest in 1946.

In 1933, Connecticut State Forester, Austin Foster Hawes named a Civilian Conservation Corps (CCC) camp located in the Nipmuck State Forest in Union, "Camp Graves" in honor of Henry.

On August 1, 1944, at a meeting of the Washington Section of the Society of American Foresters held at the Cosmos Club in Washington, DC, Graves was presented the Sir William Schlich Memorial Award. Graves was the third person to receive this SAF award for distinguished service to American forestry. Clarence Korstian read a prepared statement by Gifford Pinchot in presenting the medal to Graves: "...I have the honor and the profound pleasure of presenting to you the Sir William Schlich memorial medal for distinguished service to American forestry. Well and truly have you earned it by a life devoted to the service of the people in forestry and in conservation. May you live long to enjoy the admiration and affection of your fellow foresters, and the respect of all who know you. It is yours by right."

Honorary Degrees: Harvard University (M.A., 1911), Syracuse University (Law, 1924), Yale University (Doctor of Law, 1940). He was a member of the Connecticut Academy of Arts and Sciences.

The Henry Solon Graves Grove is located within Del Norte Coast Redwoods State Park. A stone marker in the grove, dedicated in 1926 reads: "The Grove of ancient Trees named in honor of Henry Solon Graves Forester, Educator and Administrator. A Leader of unusual ability in the profession of forestry in which he has rendered distinguished service to his country".

Henry married Ella Marian Welch (Vassar, A.B., 1895) on December 19, 1903.

== See also ==
- United States Chief Foresters
- National Irrigation Congress

== Notes ==
Political offices
Preceded by Gifford Pinchot	Chief of the United States Forest Service; 1910–1920	Succeeded by William B. Greeley
