= John R. McGuire =

10th Chief of the United States Forest Service

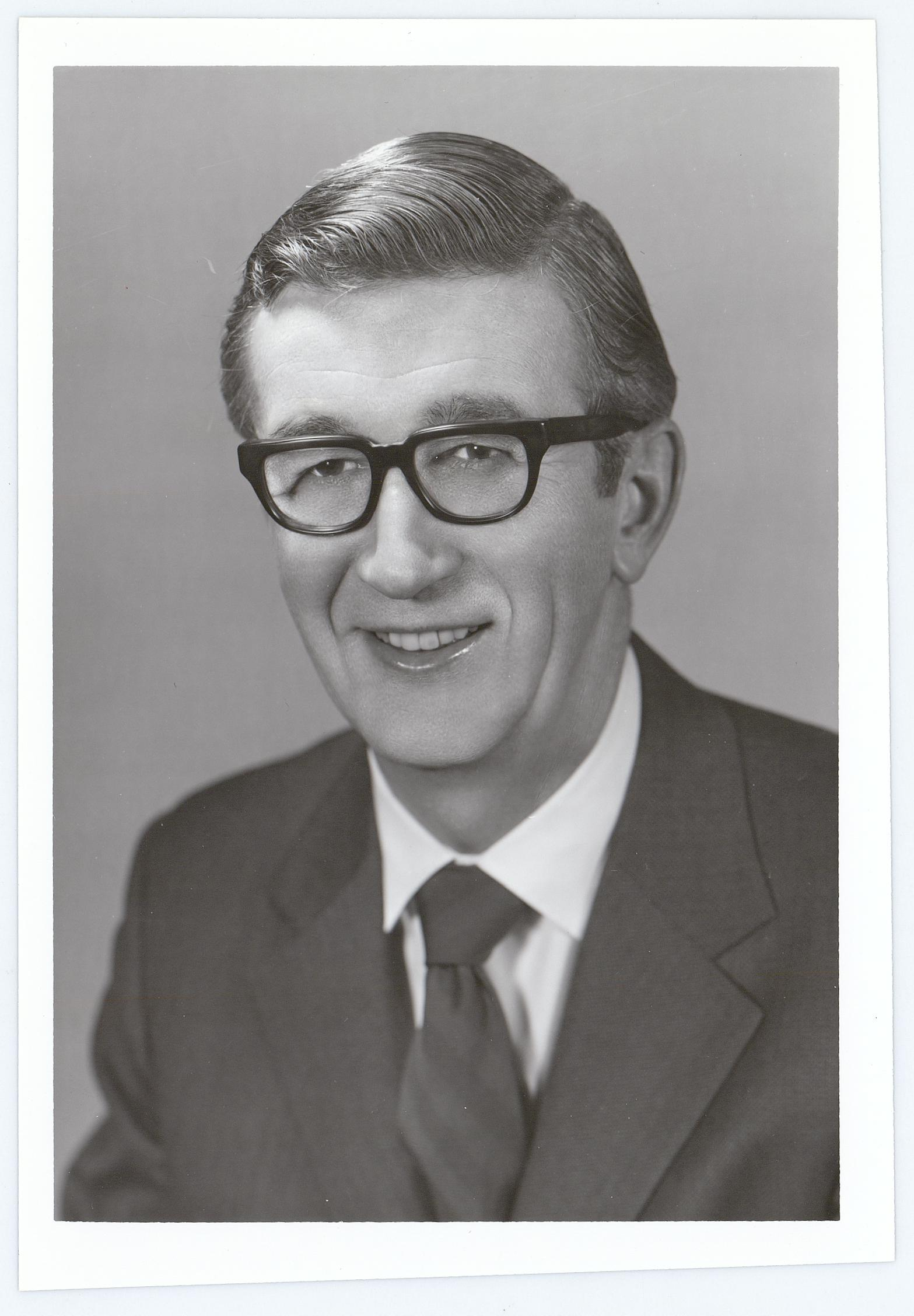

10th Chief of the United States Forest Service
- In office April 30, 1972 – June 30, 1979
- President: Richard Nixon; Gerald Ford; Jimmy Carter
- Preceded by: Edward P. Cliff
- Succeeded by: R. Max Peterson

Personal details
- Born: April 20, 1916 Milwaukee, Wisconsin
- Died: April 6, 2002 (aged 85) Gaithersburg, Maryland
- Spouse: Marjory Graff McGuire
- Education: University of Minnesota; Yale University; University of Pennsylvania
- Occupation: Forester
- Awards: President's Award for Distinguished Federal Civilian Service; USDA Distinguished Service Award; Schlich Memorial Award, Society of American Foresters; Fellow, Society of American Foresters

Military service
- Allegiance: United States
- Branch/service: United States Army
- Rank: Major
- Commands: 8th Engineer Battalion
- Battles/wars: World War II

John R. McGuire (April 20, 1916 – April 6, 2002) served as the tenth Chief of the United States Forest Service (USFS) of the Department of Agriculture, from April 30, 1972, to June 30, 1979.

== Early life and education ==
John Richard McGuire was born on April 20, 1916, in Milwaukee, Wisconsin. He received his B.S.F. degree from the University of Minnesota in 1939 and obtained a part-time Forest Service research position in Columbus, Ohio. McGuire then earned a scholarship to Yale University, where he worked at the Forest Service research facility on the campus while pursuing his M.F., awarded in 1941.

== Career ==
During World War II, McGuire served with the United States Army in the Pacific, rising to the rank of major and commanding officer of the Eighth Engineers, which was part of the first American forces to occupy Manila and Tokyo.

After the war he returned to New Haven, Connecticut, to work for the Forest Service's Northeastern Forest Experiment Station in 1945. In 1950 he was transferred to the station's Upper Darby, Pennsylvania, headquarters where he did forestry economics research while earning his M.A. in economics at the University of Pennsylvania. In 1957 he became a division director of the Pacific Southwest Forest and Range Experiment Station in Berkeley, California. Ten years later he was transferred to Washington, D.C., as deputy chief in charge of programs and legislation, and in 1971 he became associate chief.

On April 30, 1972, McGuire became the tenth chief of the Forest Service.

During his tenure as chief the service modified and integrated its methods of land management and weathered the attacks of some environmental critics. One of the most divisive issues he faced was clearcutting. McGuire worked to balance the needs of the lumber industry, the concerns of environmentalists and average citizens who might be shocked by the aesthetic result of the cutting. McGuire made changes to strengthen the roles of the branches of state and private forestry and that of research to help implement the Forest and Rangeland Renewable Resources Planning Act (RPA) of 1974 and the National Forest Management Act of 1976. He also engaged in a successful program to involve the public in establishing additional wilderness areas within the national forests.

McGuire officially retired from the Forest Service on June 30, 1979.

During his career McGuire received the President's Award for Distinguished Federal Civilian Service (1979), the U.S. Department of Agriculture Distinguished Service Award (1975), the J. Sterling Morton Award of the National Arbor Day Foundation (1981), the American Forestry Association Distinguished Service Award (1983), the Sir William Schlich Memorial Medal awarded by the Society of American Foresters (1984), and was named a Fellow of the Society of American Foresters (1973). He also served as Chairman of the U.S. delegation to the Eighth World Forestry Congress in Indonesia, and was a member of the Boone and Crockett Club.

McGuire died on April 6, 2002, in Gaithersburg, Maryland.

== See also ==
- United States Chief Foresters

Political offices
Preceded by Edward P. Cliff	Chief of the United States Forest Service; 1972–1979	Succeeded by R. Max Peterson
