= Clarence Korstian =

American scientist

Clarence F. Korstian
- Born: June 26, 1889; Saline County, Nebraska, United States
- Died: February 22, 1968 (aged 78); Durham, North Carolina, United States
- Education: University of Nebraska, Yale University
- Known for: Forestry education; Duke Forest
- Spouse: Catherine Dick
- Children: Kenneth Korstian; Robert Korstian; Grace K. Graham
- Awards: Fellow, Society of American Foresters (1942); North Carolina Forestry Association Achievement Award (1955)
- Scientific career
- Fields: Forestry
- Workplaces: Duke University; U.S. Forest Service

Clarence Korstian (June 26, 1889 – February 22, 1968) was an influential professor of forestry and the founding dean of the Duke University School of Forestry in 1938. Korstian was one of the leaders in North Carolina forestry during the nearly half century he lived in the state.

== Early life and education ==
Clarence Ferdinand Korstian was born June 26, 1889, in Saline County, Nebraska. He earned a B.S.F. degree from the University of Nebraska in 1911, and a M.F. degree from Nebraska in 1913. He received a M.A. degree from Southeastern Christian College in 1924. He served as a research fellow at Yale University from 1925 to 1926, earning a PhD. in forestry from Yale in 1926.

== Career ==
Korstian began his two decade career with the U.S. Forest Service in 1910 as a field assistant. From 1922 to 1930 he worked at the Appalachian Forest Experiment Station in Asheville, North Carolina. In 1930 he accepted the directorship of the Duke University Research and Demonstration Forest. In 1938 he was named founding dean and professor of silviculture to the newly created School of Forestry at Duke University. He was instrumental in developing one of the nation's leading forestry programs during his tenure, while also managing and expanding Duke Forest. Korstian retired from Duke in June 1959.

During his career Korstian served on the executive council of the Society of American Foresters from 1932 to 1935, and as the Society's president from 1938 to 1941. He helped establish the Southern Appalachian Section of the Society of American Foresters in 1921. Korstian also served as vice president of the American Forestry Association from 1939 to 1941, president of the North Carolina Forestry Association from 1943 to 1947, chairman of the North Carolina Forestry Council from 1949 to 1951, and president of the North Carolina Academy of Science from 1949 to 1950.

== Legacy ==
Following his retirement in 1959, one of the major divisions of Duke Forest was named in his honor.
