= Lyle F. Watts =

American forester (1890–1962)

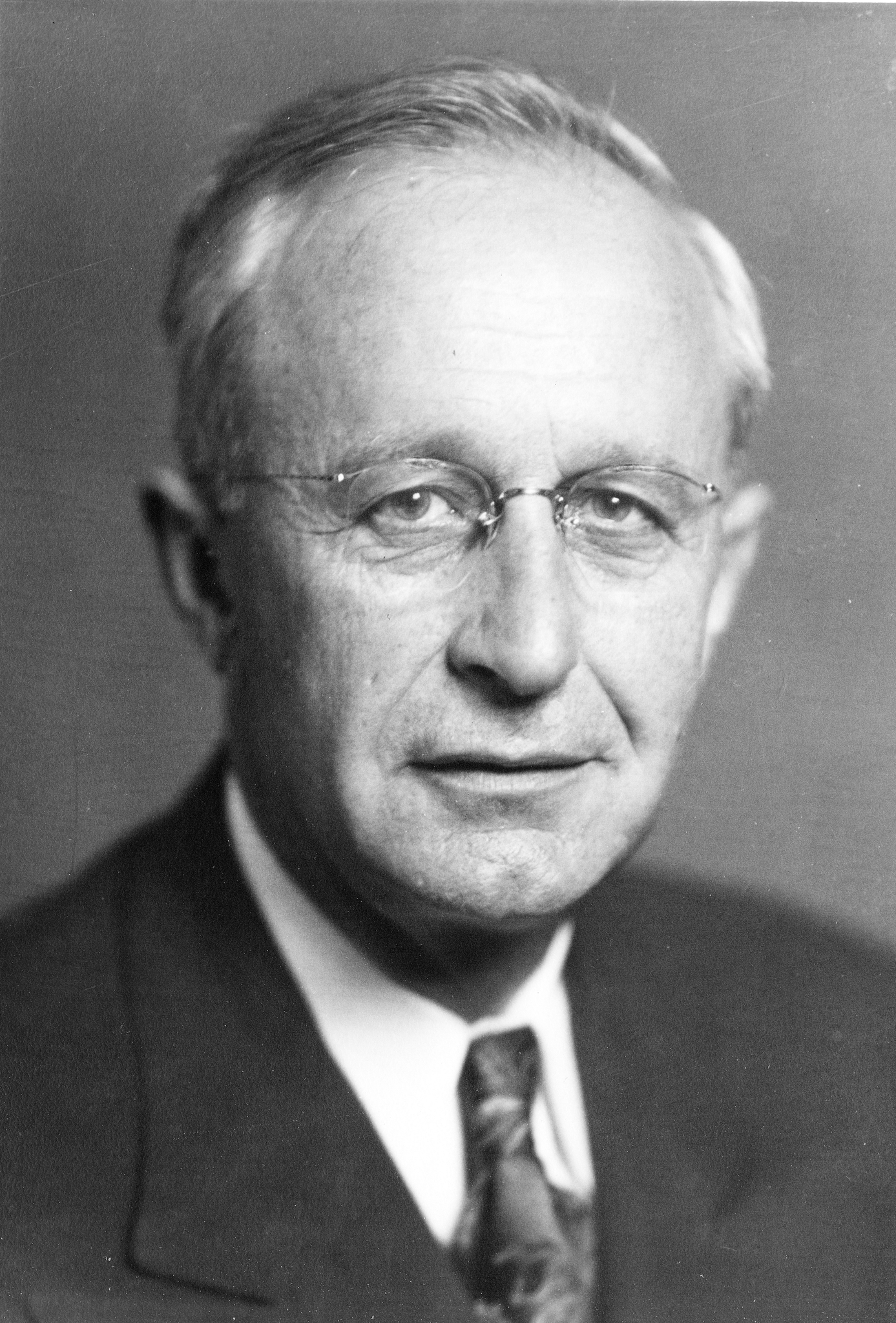

7th Chief of the United States Forest Service
- In office January 8, 1943 – June 30, 1952
- President: Franklin D. Roosevelt; Harry S. Truman
- Preceded by: Earle H. Clapp
- Succeeded by: Richard E. McArdle

Personal details
- Born: November 18, 1890 Cerro Gordo County, Iowa
- Died: June 15, 1962 (aged 71) Portland, Oregon
- Spouse: Nell Bowman
- Education: Iowa State University
- Occupation: Forester
- Awards: Knight of the Order of Agricultural Merit, France (1947); Fellow, Society of American Foresters (1945); USDA Distinguished Service Award

Lyle F. Watts (November 18, 1890 – June 15, 1962) served as the seventh Chief of the United States Forest Service (USFS) of the Department of Agriculture, from January 1943 to June 1952.

== Early life and education ==
Lyle Ford Watts was born on November 18, 1890, at his family's farm in Lincoln Township, Cerro Gordo County, Iowa. His parents were James A. Watts and Mary Jane Liggett. Watts graduated from high school in Clear Lake, Iowa, before attending Iowa State College in Ames. He received a B.S. Degree from Iowa State in 1913. He later received M.S.F. and honorary D.Sc. degrees from there as well. As a student he had two summer jobs with the Forest Service, which he joined upon graduation.

== Career ==
Watts began his Forest Service career as a laborer in the western United States. He quickly progressed upward through the ranks, serving as supervisor of the Boise National Forest, followed by the same position on the Weiser National Forest and the Idaho National Forest.

From 1931 to 1936 he was director of the Northern Rocky Mountain Forest Experiment Station at Missoula, Montana. In 1936 he was appointed regional forester for the North Central Region. Three years later he became regional forester for the Pacific Northwest Region at Portland, Oregon.

In the fall of 1942 Watts was called to Washington, D.C., as a special assistant to Secretary of Agriculture Claude Wickard for wartime farm labor activities. On January 8, 1943, Watts became the seventh Chief of the Forest Service.

When Watts was appointed as Chief Forester, Secretary Wickard made the following statement: "Mr. Watts' broad experience and understanding of the country's need for protecting and maintaining the productivity of our forest land will be of particular value in wartime. He has a sound grasp of a program designed to meet the requirements of this emergency as well as the long range needs of the Nation in conserving and developing its forest lands."

Watts oversaw the agency during the war years. About 2,000 employees left the Forest Service to enter the armed forces during World War II. Watts was nonetheless able to maintain the Agency's efficiency while also performing numerous special war jobs.

After the war many of the American GIs returned to go back to college, with the growing fields of forestry and engineering taking many candidates through to graduation. Watts encouraged the Forest Service to hire these new graduates to assist in the development of forest road systems and intensively managed, sustained yield forests.

Significant legislation improving cooperation between Federal and State governments and private landowners followed, including the Forest Pest Control Act of 1947 and the Cooperative Forest Management Act of 1950.

Watts retired at the age of 62 on June 30, 1952. Paying tribute to Watts upon his retirement, Secretary of Agriculture Charles F. Brannan said: "He has been one of the most effective and courageous leaders of the Forest Service in the great tradition of its service to the American people. Under his guidance, forestry has taken a much greater part in the agricultural resources conservation program and has become an essential part of American agriculture."

Watts died on June 15, 1962, in Portland, Oregon.

== Awards ==
Watts has named a Fellow of the Society of American Foresters in 1945. Watts received the Order of Agricultural Merit (Croix du Chevalier de la Merite Agricole) from France in 1947 for his work in world forestry. He also earned a U.S. Department of Agriculture Distinguished Service Award.

== See also ==
- United States Chief Foresters

Political offices
Preceded by Earle H. Clapp	Chief of the United States Forest Service; 1943–1952	Succeeded by Richard E. McArdle
