= General Land Exchange Act of 1922 =

Federal law

- Long title: An Act to consolidate national forest lands by authorizing exchanges of lands or interests therein.
- Enacted by: the 67th United States Congress

Citations
- Public law: Pub. L. 67–173
- Statutes at Large: 42 Stat. 465

Codification
- Acts amended: Communications Act of 1934
- U.S.C. sections created: 16 U.S.C. §§ 485–486

Legislative history
- Introduced in the Senate and House (as separate bills) as S. 2993 / H.R. 9047; Signed into law by President Warren G. Harding on March 20, 1922

The General Land Exchange Act of 1922 (16 U.S.C. 485, 486) was signed into law by President of the United States Warren G. Harding on March 20, 1922 This act allowed the U.S. Forest Service to consolidate its holdings in national forests where a large percentage of private lands were intermingled with forest lands. It made possible the exchange of inholdings within national forests for private lands of equal value and within the same state.

This act also made for better management and administration in accordance with future planning initiatives because the process of a mutually desirable exchange was greatly simplified by this legislation to a matter of just signing papers.

Chief Forester William B. Greeley predicted in 1922 that "this law would probably be regarded as one of the half-dozen most important laws affecting the National Forests."
