= Multiple-Use Sustained-Yield Act of 1960 =

- Long title: An Act to authorize and direct that the national forests be managed under principles of multiple use and to produce a sustained yield of products and services, and for other purposes.
- Acronyms (colloquial): MUSYA
- Nicknames: Sustained Yield Act of 1960
- Enacted by: the 86th United States Congress
- Effective: June 12, 1960

Citations
- Public law: 86-517
- Statutes at Large: 74 Stat. 215

Codification
- Titles amended: 16 U.S.C.: Conservation
- U.S.C. sections amended: 16 U.S.C. ch. 3, subch. IV § 583 et seq.

Legislative history
- Introduced in the House as H.R. 10572 by George M. Grant (D-AL) on April 25, 1960; Committee consideration by House Agriculture, Senate Agriculture and Forestry; Passed the House on June 2, 1960 (Passed); Passed the Senate on June 8, 1960, in lieu of S. 3044 (Passed); Signed into law by President Dwight D. Eisenhower on June 12, 1960

The Multiple-Use Sustained-Yield Act of 1960 (or MUSYA) (Public Law 86-517) is a federal law passed by the United States Congress on June 12, 1960. This law authorizes and directs the Secretary of Agriculture to develop and administer the renewable resources of timber, range, water, recreation and wildlife on the national forests for multiple use and sustained yield of the products and services.

This is the first law to have the five major uses of national forests contained in one law equally, with no use greater than any other.

By the 1950s, the national forests no longer held enough resources to meet the growing needs of an increasing population and expanding economy. The U.S. Forest Service had operated within broad authorities since Gifford Pinchot's time as Chief Forester. Now, for the first time the agency had a specific congressional directive which stipulated that timber sales were not in all cases to be the limiting factor.

MUSYA defines the terms "multiple use" and "sustained yield" as follows:

- Multiple use - the "management of all the various renewable surface resources of the national forests so that they are utilized in the combination that will best meet the needs of the American people ...."
- Sustained yield - "the achievement and maintenance in perpetuity of a high-level annual or regular periodic output of the various renewable resources of the national forests without impairment of the productivity of the land."

The 1960 law was amended by the Omnibus Parks and Public Lands Management Act of 1996.
