= William B. Greeley =

American forester (1879–1955)

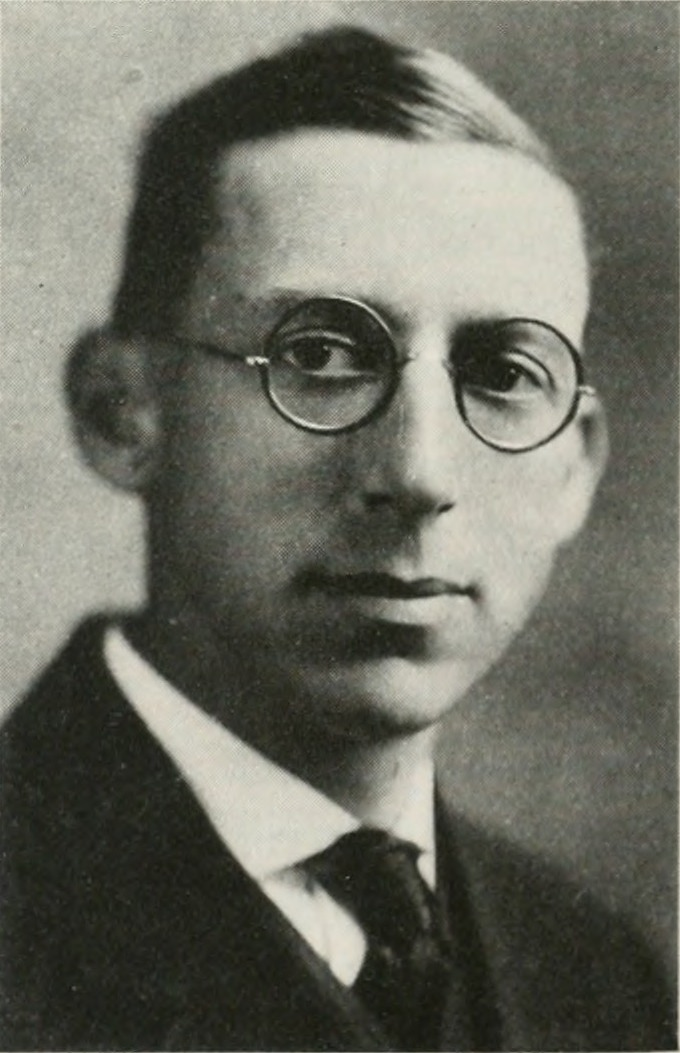

3rd Chief of the United States Forest Service
- In office April 15, 1920 – May 1, 1928
- President: Woodrow Wilson; Warren G. Harding; Calvin Coolidge
- Preceded by: Henry S. Graves
- Succeeded by: Robert Y. Stuart

Personal details
- Born: September 6, 1879 Oswego, New York
- Died: November 30, 1955 (aged 76) Suquamish, Washington
- Spouse: Gertrude Jewett
- Education: University of California, Berkeley; Yale University
- Occupation: Forester
- Civilian awards: Schlich Memorial Award (Society of American Foresters); Fellow, Society of American Foresters; Yale Medal

Military service
- Allegiance: United States
- Branch/service: United States Army
- Rank: Lieutenant Colonel
- Commands: 20th Engineers (Forestry)
- Battles/wars: World War I
- Military awards: Distinguished Service Medal (U.S. Army); Chevalier Legion of Honour (France); Distinguished Service Order (Great Britain)

William Buckhout Greeley (September 6, 1879 – November 30, 1955) was the third chief of the United States Forest Service, a position he held from 1920 to 1928. During World War I he commanded U.S. Army forest engineers in France, providing Allied forces with the timber necessary for the war effort.

== Early life and education ==
Greeley was born September 6, 1879, in Oswego, New York, to parents Frank Norton Greeley, a Congregational clergyman, and Anna Cheney (Buckhout) Greeley. He graduated from the University of California, Berkeley in 1901, and received a Master of Forestry degree from Yale University in 1904.

== Forestry career ==
After finishing at the top of the first Yale forestry graduating class of 1904, Greeley was handpicked by Gifford Pinchot to be the Forest Service's Region 1 forester. In that position, he had responsibility over 41 million acres (170,000 km2) in 22 National Forests in four western states (all of Montana, much of Idaho, Washington, and a corner of South Dakota).

One year after the Great Fire of 1910 Greeley received a promotion to a high administration job in Washington. In 1920, he became Chief of the Forest Service. The fire of 1910 elevated firefighting to the overriding mission of the Forest Service. Under Greeley, the Forest Service protected trees so the timber industry could cut them down later at government expense. Pinchot was appalled. The timber industry successfully oriented the Forestry Service toward policies favorable to large-scale harvesting via regulatory capture, and metaphorically, the timber industry was now the fox in the chicken coop. Pinchot and Theodore Roosevelt had envisioned, at the least, that public timber should be sold only to small, family-run logging outfits, not to big syndicates. Pinchot had always preached of a "working forest" for working people and small-scale logging at the edge, preservation at the core. In 1928 Bill Greeley left the Forest Service for a position in the timber industry, becoming an executive with the West Coast Lumberman's Association.

When Pinchot traveled west in 1937, to view those forests with Henry S. Graves, what they saw "tore his heart out." Greeley's legacy, combining modern chain saws and government-built forest roads, had allowed industrial-scale clear-cuts to become the norm in the western national forests of Montana and Oregon. Entire mountainsides, mountain after mountain, were treeless. "So this is what saving the trees was all about." "Absolute devastation", Pinchot wrote in his diary. "The Forest Service should absolutely declare against clear- cutting in Washington and Oregon as a defensive measure", Pinchot wrote.

In 1924 Greeley established the first wilderness area in the United States: Gila Wilderness in Gila National Forest, New Mexico.

During his career Greeley gave outstanding support to the Yale School of Forestry, first as an organizer of the school's graduate advisory board (1905) and as founder and first president of its alumni association, and later in planning and securing financing for its post-World War II development program. In 1955 he was awarded the Yale Medal. He was also honored posthumously with the naming of the William B. Greeley Memorial Laboratory at Yale.

Greeley also served the Society of American Foresters (SAF) in various capacities, including president (1915) and member of its governing council (1944–1949). He was elected an SAF Fellow in 1918, and in 1946 became the third Forest Service Chief to receive its highest award, the Sir William Schlich Memorial Medal.

== World War I service ==
Following the outbreak of World War I Greeley was commissioned in the United States Army as a major assigned to the 10th Engineers (Forestry). He sailed for France in August 1917. A year later he became chief of the Forestry Section for the 20th Engineers and Attached Service Troops and remained in charge until the Armistice. Greeley supervised the work of 21,000 troops and operated 95 sawmills in France turning out two million board feet of lumber a day for the war effort. For his service, Greeley was awarded the Distinguished Service Medal (U.S. Army), the Distinguished Service Order (Great Britain), and named a Chevalier of the Legion of Honour (France). Greeley returned to the U.S. in July 1919 after nearly two years of service, resuming his position with the Forest Service. He retained his commission as lieutenant colonel in the Engineer Officers' Reserve Corps. For the rest of his career he would often be addressed as "Colonel" Greeley in recognition of his superb wartime record.

== See also ==
- United States Chief Foresters

Political offices
Preceded by Henry S. Graves	Chief of the United States Forest Service; 1920–1928	Succeeded by Robert Y. Stuart
