= Xi Sigma Pi =

International forestry honor society

- ΞΣΠ
- Founded: November 24, 1908; 117 years ago University of Washington
- Type: Honor
- Affiliation: ACHS
- Status: Active
- Emphasis: Forestry
- Scope: North America
- Colors: Green and Gray
- Chapters: 34 active
- Members: 24,000+ lifetime
- Headquarters: Xi Sigma Pi - National Office, Oregon State University; 3100 SW Jefferson Way; 216 PFSC; Corvallis, Oregon 97331; United States
- Website: www.xisigmapi.org

Xi Sigma Pi (ΞΣΠ) is an international honor society for Forestry and related sciences. It was founded on November 24, 1908, at the University of Washington and has chartered 46 chapters in the United States and Canada.

== History ==
Xi Sigma Pi was founded on November 28, 1908, at the University of Washington. It was created "to secure and maintain a high standard of scholarship in forestry education, to work for the improvement of the forestry profession, and to promote a fraternal spirit among those engaged in activities related to the forest." The mission has been expanded in recent years to award students of similar achievement in the natural resources related to the forested environment.

It remained a local organization until 1915 when discussion and a new constitution led to an opening for national expansion. The Beta chapter was founded at Michigan State University in 1916, followed by the University of Maine in 1917. Over 40 chapters have now been established.

Xi Sigma Pi was admitted to the Association of College Honor Societies in 1965, temporarily dropped membership in the late 1990s, and was reinstated at the 2017 ACHS convention. In 1991, the society had 24,000 initiates, 42 active chapters, and one inactive chapter.

== Symbols ==
The Xi SIgma Pi badge is an oval key or pin with an engraved fir tree surmounting an inverted crescent. Surrounding the tree are the capital Greek letters ΞΣΠ, and beneath it an oval containing the Greek letters ΠΑ.

Its colors are green and gray (Note that until 1992 they had been green and navy).

== Chapters ==
The Society has established 46 chapters in the United States and Canada; 34 remain active as of 2024.

== Membership ==
Undergraduates eligible for election as active members of a chapter must have completed a minimum of 74 semester hours of scholastic work (or 110 quarter-system hours), be ranked in the upper 25 percent of their class, and have attained a scholastic average equivalent to "B" or higher letter grade. The student must have completed 10 of their semester hours (15 quarter-system hours) in forestry resources management classes.

An individual's personality and character are scrutinized no less closely than their scholastic rank. The student must have shown a creditable interest and activity in their curriculum, and give promise of attaining high professional achievement. Election to membership is dependent upon a composite rating rather than upon scholastic ability alone. Provisions are made for graduate students and faculty to join, with the intent that chapters encourage all levels of membership.

== Activities ==
The society seeks to encourage the long-term health of the profession by contributing to the endowment fund of the Society of American Foresters. To support scholarship, the society established a national technical paper contest, with regional scholarship awards that recognize excellence in forestry academic achievement. Up to five regional winners are selected by participating chapters.

== Governance ==
Government is by convention, held biennially in conjunction with the annual meetings of the Society of American Foresters. Each biennium, a chapter is designated the National Chapter, from which national officers of that biennium are chosen. The current governing chapter is the Zeta chapter at Oregon State University in Corvallis, Oregon.

== See also ==
- Professional fraternities and sororities
