= Society of American Foresters =

Official logo as of 2022

The Society of American Foresters (SAF) is a professional organization representing the forestry industry in the United States. Its mission statement declares that it seeks to "advance the science, education, and practice of forestry; to enhance the competency of its members; to establish professional excellence; and, to use the knowledge, skills and conservation ethic of the profession to ensure the continued health and use of forest ecosystems and the present and future availability of forest resources to benefit society". Its headquarters are located in Washington, D.C.

== History ==
The Society of American Foresters was founded on November 30, 1900, by Gifford Pinchot and seven colleagues in the U.S. Department of Agriculture's Division of Forestry.

=== Membership and structure ===
As of 2018, SAF had 11,000 members and is the largest professional organization for foresters. SAF is structured around two networks: a geographic network and a network of scientific disciplines. The geographic network has 31 state societies, subdivided into divisions and chapters; student chapters exist at many forestry schools The scientific disciplinary network has 20 working groups, each a self-selected cluster of SAF members interested in a particular area of science.

== Education ==
=== Accreditation ===
The SAF is active in improving the quality of postsecondary forestry education in the United States.

From 2001 to 2015, the Council for Higher Education Accreditation recognized SAF as an accrediting organization for academic degree programs in professional forestry, both at a Bachelor's and Master's level. Accreditation is provided for selected programs, not institutions or academic departments. In 2015, the Council ceased to recognize the organization.

SAF maintains a list of its accredited programs in forestry, urban forestry, natural resources and ecosystem management, and forest technology on their website. It also publishes an annual college guide to help secondary school students and guidance counselors become better informed about career opportunities in forestry and natural resources.

=== Continuing education ===
SAF offers a Continuing Forestry Education (CFE) program and a Certified Forester credential program. Some states with licensing or registration statutes and regulations for professional foresters require continuing education credits to renew a license or registration. For example, Maine and Alabama accept SAF's CFE credits.

=== Publications ===
The SAF produces two periodic journals, published by Oxford University Press: the Journal of Forestry and Forest Science. Past volumes and issues of both journals are available through their respective Oxford University Press websites.

Journal of Forestry, in print since 1902, is a peer-reviewed journal published bimonthly: January, March, May, July, September, and November. ISSN 0022-1201. The current Editor-in-Chief is Dr. Keith A. Blatner. Impact factors for Journal of Forestry can be found on the Oxford University Press website.

Forest Science, in print since 1955, is a peer-reviewed scientific journal published bimonthly: February, April, June, August, October, and December. ISSN 0015-749X. The current Editor-in-Chief is Dr. Scott Roberts. Impact factors for Forest Science can be found on the Oxford University Press website.

From 1977 to 2013, SAF published three regional journals: the Southern Journal of Applied Forestry; the Northern Journal of Applied Forestry; and the Western Journal of Applied Forestry. In 2013, the three regional journals were absorbed into the applied research section of Forest Science. Issues are archived online by Oxford University Press.

SAF also publishes a variety of technical publications, such as the Dictionary of Forestry.

The Forestry Source, ISSN 1084-5496, is a monthly newspaper for SAF members that reports on current events.

The E-Forester is an electronic newsletter emailed to SAF members and subscribed nonmembers weekly.

=== Conventions and meetings ===
State societies of SAF hold annual or semi-annual meetings to advance networking among members, review recent scientific findings, conduct continuing forestry education, and plan local outreach activities.

Each year, SAF also holds a national convention, open to both non-members and members. Each convention has a theme, plenary sessions, and a wide variety of concurrent technical sessions, each a cluster of scientific papers focused on a specific topic. The concurrent sessions span the breadth and diversity of the ecological, economic, and social sciences related to forests. The location of the national convention rotates around the United States to make it easier for SAF members from different parts of the country to attend. Proceedings are published in a subsequent issue of the Journal of Forestry. For example, proceedings from the October 3–7, 2018, convention in Portland, Oregon, were published in the January 2019 issue.

== Awards ==
SAF recognizes distinguished individual achievements in forestry through its awards program. The society features numerous awards in various categories.

=== Sir William Schlich Memorial Award ===
The oldest and most prestigious SAF award, dating from 1935, is the Sir William Schlich Memorial Award. Named for the influential German forester Wilhelm Philipp Daniel Schlich, the award recognizes broad and outstanding contributions to the field of forestry with emphasis on policy and national or international activities. Notable winners of the Schlich Memorial Award include Franklin D. Roosevelt (1935), Gifford Pinchot (1940), Henry S. Graves (1944), William B. Greeley (1946), Ralph Hosmer (1950), Tom Gill (1954), Richard E. McArdle (1962), and John R. McGuire (1984).

=== Gifford Pinchot Medal ===
The Gifford Pinchot Medal recognizes "outstanding contributions by a forestry professional in the administration, practice, and professional development of North American Forestry." Notable winners of the Gifford Pinchot Medal include Henry S. Graves (1950), Raphael Zon (1952), Earle H. Clapp (1960), and Edward P. Cliff (1973).

=== Fellows ===
One of the highest honors for SAF members is the rank of Fellow. This is an exceptional recognition bestowed on a member by his or her peers for outstanding contributions and service to the SAF and the profession. Notable Fellows include William B. Greeley (1918), Bernhard Eduard Fernow (1918), Austin Cary (1924), Lyle F. Watts (1945), Edward P. Cliff (1963), and John R. McGuire (1973).

== See also ==
- List of forestry universities and colleges
- Xi Sigma Pi Forestry Honors Society
