= USS Arizona Operation 85 =

Initiative to identify the remains from the USS Arizona

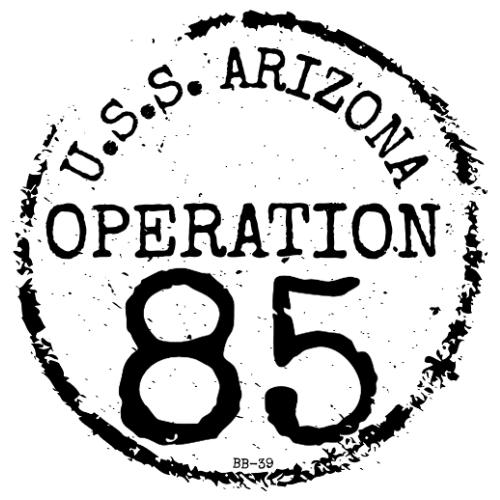
- Formation: April 6, 2023; 3 years ago
- Headquarters: Washington, D.C.
- Executive Director: Kevin D. Kline
- Volunteers: 4
- Award: DPAA Superior Public Service Award
- Website: www.ussarizona.navy

USS Arizona "Operation 85" is a civilian lead initiative aimed at identifying 85 or more unknown American servicemen from the battleship USS Arizona which were killed in the attack on Pearl Harbor, who are interred in commingled graves and marked as "unknown" at the National Memorial Cemetery of the Pacific, or Punchbowl Cemetery, located 10 miles (16 km) away from the location of the wreck of USS Arizona at Pearl Harbor, Hawaii.

== Background on the USS Arizona Unknowns ==
On December 7, 1941, the USS Arizona suffered a catastrophic attack at Pearl Harbor, resulting in the loss of 1,177 crew members. The large majority of these servicemen were either considered "cremated by the explosion in the forward magazine of the battleship and the resulting fire" or trapped within the ship itself and are unrecoverable. However, a large number of suspected USS Arizona crew remains were recovered, but were unable to be identified after the attack and were then subsequently buried at either Halawa or Nuuanu cemeteries in Oahu, Hawaii.

One of many grave markers located at the National Memorial Cemetery of the Pacific that marks the location of USS Arizona unknowns. (Photo: Jim McCoy)

In September 1947, the American Graves Registration Service (AGRS) undertook the task of excavating approximately 170 unidentified bodies from the Halawa and Nuuanu cemeteries, thought to be linked with the Arizona. These remains were then transported to the Central Identification Laboratory at Schofield Barracks on Oahu for analysis. The team at the laboratory worked to ascertain the identities of the unidentified remains with the best methods they had available to them at the time. The effort led to the successful identification of over 100 sailors from the Arizona. However, many remains were also deemed unidentifiable as DNA technology to identify them was non-existent at the time. Those remains, presumed to be from the Arizona, were then reinterred at the National Memorial Cemetery of the Pacific in 76 different graves and marked as "unknown."

Many surviving family members from the missing crew claim they were never made aware that remains from the Arizona crew were removed and separated from the ship. Most believed those killed were beneath the USS Arizona Memorial.

== Failed attempt to resolve USS Arizona Unknowns by DPAA ==
In February 2021, the Defense POW/MIA Accounting Agency (DPAA), the US agency tasked with recovering and identifying missing US service members, had suggested the unprecedented step of disinterring the USS Arizona unknown crew buried at the Punchbowl and re-interring them back in the sunken battleship in Pearl Harbor without any attempt to identify the remains.

DPAA Director Kelly McKeague stated in a February 20, 2021 DPAA Family Update Meeting, "We have had preliminary discussions with the Navy, and one of the proposals that we have notionally talked about is to disinter all of them — not for the purpose of identification — but to entomb them in the hull of the Arizona along with their shipmates."

Surviving family members became upset at the proposal to not identify the unknown service members first. Also, without proper identification, there is no assurance the remains within the unknown USS Arizona graves at the Punchbowl are actually all Arizona crew members. After much public pushback, the DPAA, along with the Assistant Secretary of Defense backpedaled on the issue and reversed their proposal. Stating they "would not be disinterring any of the remains to re-inter within the ship hull without identifying them."

== Feasibility and cost associated with identifying the USS Arizona remains ==
In March 2022, a study was released to the United States Congress which was conducted by the Office of the Assistant Secretary of the Navy Manpower and Reserve Affairs which stated the cost to locate the surviving family members of the USS Arizona would run the United States Navy and United States Marine Corps $2.7 million, consume 12,600 man hours, and take 10 years to complete. Due to the feasibility study, DPAA Director Kelly McKeague has been firmly against resolving the unknowns from the Arizona through DNA identification, claiming the project was not equitable, and would consume all of their budget and resources for 10 years. The DPAA currently refuses to even acknowledge the USS Arizona unknowns within their own "Pearl Harbor Project" meant to bring attention to families in an effort to provide DNA for all missing from the December 7 attack.

== Family member funds and launches "Operation 85" to locate USS Arizona family members ==
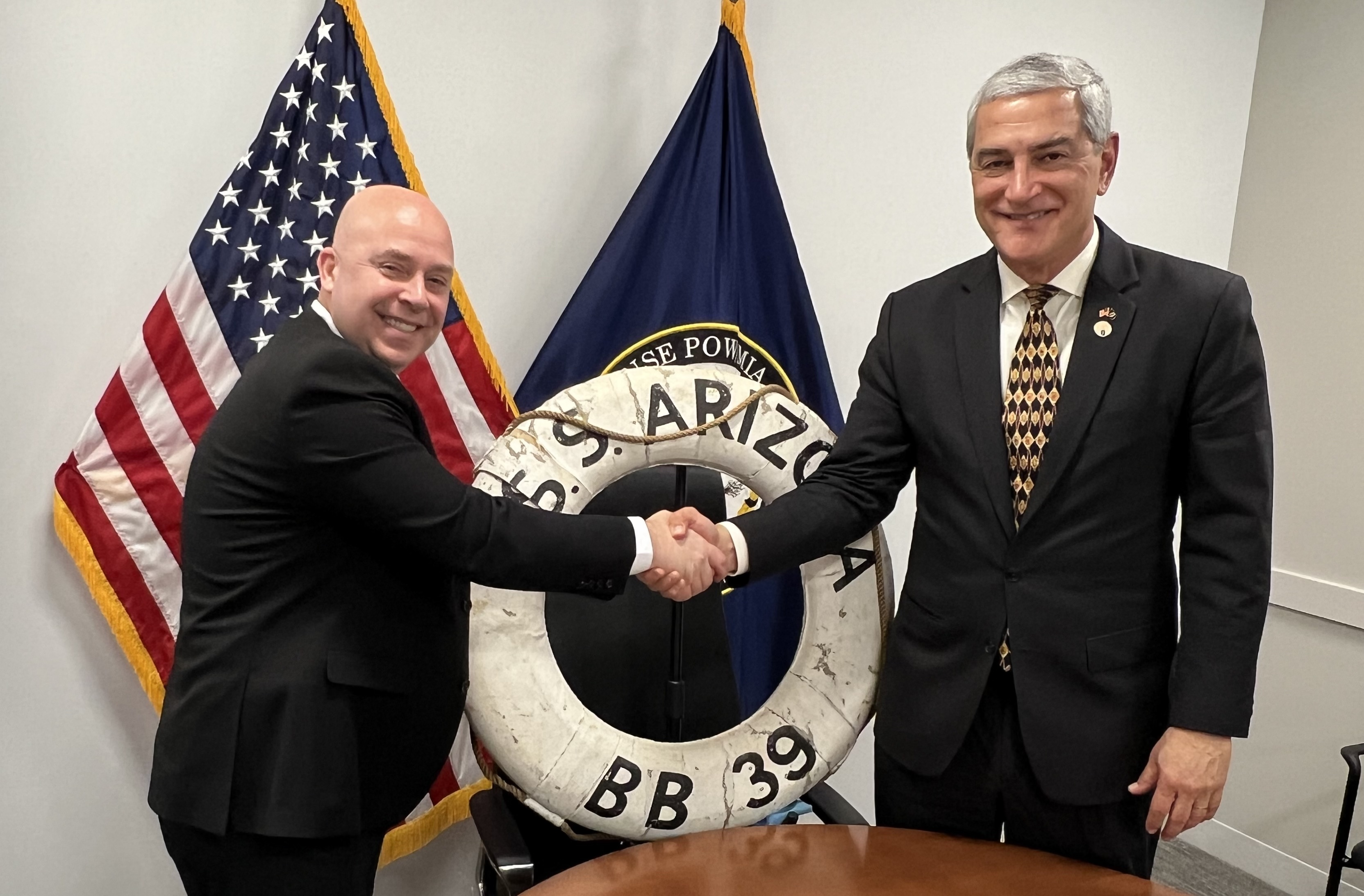
Operation 85 Executive Director Kevin Kline (left) meets with DPAA Director Kelly McKeague on May 17, 2023, in Arlington, Virginia

"Operation 85" (OP85) officially began on April 6, 2023, led and organized by Kevin Kline, the grandnephew of GM2c Robert Edwin Kline, a USS Arizona casualty and US Navy sailor killed on December 7, 1941, and who is still considered one of the 1,072 missing.

Operation 85 has taken on the monumental task of locating the surviving family members of the missing crew of the Arizona and soliciting a DNA Family Reference Sample from each family member to the US Navy and the US Marine Corps Casualty offices for possible identification of the USS Arizona unknowns. Kline, a real estate agent from Northern Virginia, put his local business on hold, spearheading and personally funding the entire cost of the project so far, claiming to have spent over $50,000 of his own money, along with devoting time and other resources to it. Kline and Operation 85 have refused to accept any outside donations for the project to ensure the focus was strictly on the mission and not on fundraising. A handful of volunteers with professional genealogy experience and similar project backgrounds have joined Kline and Operation 85 to ensure the organization is properly vetting and documenting the family members as well as ensuring all genealogy standard protocols, documentation and attestations are followed that are commonly accepted by the DPAA for these types of projects.

== Progress and challenges ==
Two early meetings occurred between Operation 85 Executive Director Kevin Kline and DPAA Director Kelly McKeague. One on May 17, 2023, and a subsequent meeting on June 28, 2023, both in Arlington, Virginia. The DPAA had not publicly mentioned the USS Arizona within their "Pearl Harbor Project," and social media posts.

The Department of Defense has set a 60% threshold policy stating that disinterment of the USS Arizona unknowns can only be considered once 60% or more of the unrecovered crew members have DNA Family Reference Samples (FRS) on file and completed with the Armed Forces DNA Identification Laboratory (AFDIL). That would mean a minimum of 643 crew members of the missing 1,072 must have DNA samples on file to even consider a disinterment.

As of September 26, 2026 the Armed Forces DNA Identification Laboratory reported 724 total crew members now have DNA representation, up from just 18 when Operation 85 began in 2023. To date, Operation 85 has claimed to have sent in enough family members to represent 755 crew members, exceeding the 643 needed to meet the DoD 60% threshold policy, and states there is about a four to six-week lag with the Navy between the time Operation 85 sends in a family member's information and the DNA kit is returned to the DPAA from the family member.

Prior to Operation 85's formation, the DPAA had not shown interest in identifying and resolving the USS Arizona unknowns. At the February 20, 2021 DPAA Family Member Update, DPAA Director McKeague stated that "we could never take on" the process of disinterring the 85 USS Arizona unknowns for identification, in part because DNA reference samples would have to be obtained from the families of all 1,177 of the ship's fatalities.

Since its inception, Operation 85 has connected with 1,796 family members of the missing crew, with more than 1,200 of them able to provide the viable yDNA and or mtDNA Family Reference Samples. Despite the initial skepticism and the high estimated cost and manpower projected within the Defense POW/MIA Accounting Agency (DPAA) and the Assistant Secretary of the Navy Manpower and Reserve Affairs Feasibility Study, Operation 85's efforts have shown efficiency and cost-effectiveness, only spending a small percentage (2.07%) of the estimated cost. The operation is proving that the cost to the US taxpayers just for the feasibility study that was conducted by the Navy on the USS Arizona Identification Project ($83,000), was higher than the total cost so far of Operation 85's efforts to locate almost 96% of the required family members, $65,000 in nineteen months. An estimate the Navy concluded would cost $2.9 million and take 10 years.

== Politics & Legislation ==
Prior to Operation 85, several attempts were made to introduce legislation towards the DPAA aimed at identifying the USS Arizona unknowns through the use of 3rd party or outside contracted forensic DNA technology. The DPAA was firmly against these amendments and all legislative efforts failed.

Operation 85 had been working with congressional representatives since May 2023 to rewrite the past failed legislation in a manner that might have a chance to succeed. On July 14, 2023, the US House of Representatives passed the National Defense Authorization Act (NDAA) for fiscal year 2024 and included the USS Arizona Amendment introduced by Colorado's 5th District Congressman Doug Lamborn with language to award a contract to a research and genealogist company to locate surviving family members and solicit their DNA Family Reference Samples. For the first time in history, legislation was passed aimed at identifying the unknowns from the USS Arizona. Despite this encouraging effort, the final language within the amendment was worded in a way that required a "genealogist to do genome sequencing", something genealogist do not do. This wording within the amendment made the ability to award a contract on the terms of the House legislation impossible. The legislation now risked stalling.

Operation 85 immediately began a lobbying campaign to rally enough elected officials within the House and Senate Armed Service Committee to change the language of the House NDAA in conference and keep the legislation moving forward.

On December 6, 2023, the US Senate released its Conference Report final wording of the 2024 NDAA. Several key factors made it into the 2024 Conference Report that affected the USS Arizona unknowns. According to page 1331 of the Conference Report, sec. 1806 of the House NDAA was not adopted, but includes the following:

- “The conferees direct the Director, Defense POW/MIA Accounting Agency, to provide a briefing to the Committees on Armed Services of the Senate and the House of Representatives, not later than April 1, 2024, on the Department’s ability to collect family reference samples for service members of the USS Arizona (including efforts by military service casualty offices), and any obstacles to such collection. The briefing should include: (1) Resource constraints for the DPAA and the military departments; (2) Technology challenges; (3) Any improvements that can be made to the sample collection process; (4) Challenges the Department and the military services face gathering family reference sample collection in other cases; and (5) Any other matters deemed relevant.”

Also, according to SEC. 1063 extra funding in the amount of $5M per year for 5 years ($25M total) was also authorized but not appropriated to the DPAA specifically for expanding their accounting for past conflicts.

== Success and Disinterment Announcement ==
On April 23, 2026, the Defense POW/MIA Accounting Agency (DPAA) announced that the required 60 percent threshold of DNA Family Reference Samples had been met for the USS Arizona Unknown Identification Project. DPAA stated that reaching the threshold allowed the agency to formally request and begin planning the disinterment of potentially 141 unknowns buried in multiple commingled graves at the National Memorial Cemetery of the Pacific in Honolulu. DPAA publicly credited USS Arizona family member Kevin Kline and the Operation 85 team for their efforts over the preceding three years to locate and connect families whose participation helped the project reach the required threshold.

Kelly McKeague, Director of the Defense POW/MIA Accounting Agency presents the Superior Public Service Award to Kevin Kline, Executive Director of Operation 85 at Arlington, Virginia, May 11, 2026. Operation 85 was launched by Kline on April 6, 2023, to identify the 85+ unknown U.S. Navy and Marine Corps service members who perished aboard the USS Arizona on December 7, 1941, and are buried today in unnamed graves at the National Memorial Cemetery of the Pacific in Honolulu. (U.S. Marine Corps photo by Cpl. Stephen Holland)

The announcement marked a change from earlier assessments that had questioned the feasibility of identifying the USS Arizona unknowns because of limited Family Reference Samples and the projected cost and time required to locate relatives. Independent reporting by Stars and Stripes stated that Operation 85 had located the majority of the families needed to meet the threshold and that DPAA planned to begin disinterment operations in late 2026.

On May 11, 2026, DPAA Director Kelly McKeague presented Kevin Kline with the Defense POW/MIA Accounting Agency’s Superior Public Service Award during DPAA’s annual All Hands meeting in Arlington, Virginia. A Department of Defense Visual Information Distribution Service caption stated that the award recognized Kline in his role as executive director of Operation 85 and described the organization’s work to identify USS Arizona unknown service members. Director McKeague told Military Times," “Being able to disinter the 86 Unknowns associated with USS Arizona is singularly due to the determined initiative and extraordinary efforts of Operation 85." And “while USS Arizona families whose loved ones were lost on that fateful day can draw solace at the solemn memorial, DPAA is honored to be able to provide long-sought answers to families of these unknowns,”

DPAA continued encouraging relatives of missing USS Arizona personnel to provide Family Reference Samples after the threshold was reached, noting that additional samples could assist future identifications. The planned project includes potentially 141 unknowns associated with the USS Arizona and other Pearl Harbor casualties buried at the National Memorial Cemetery of the Pacific.
