= Pearl Harbor National Memorial =

National Memorial of the United States in Hawaii

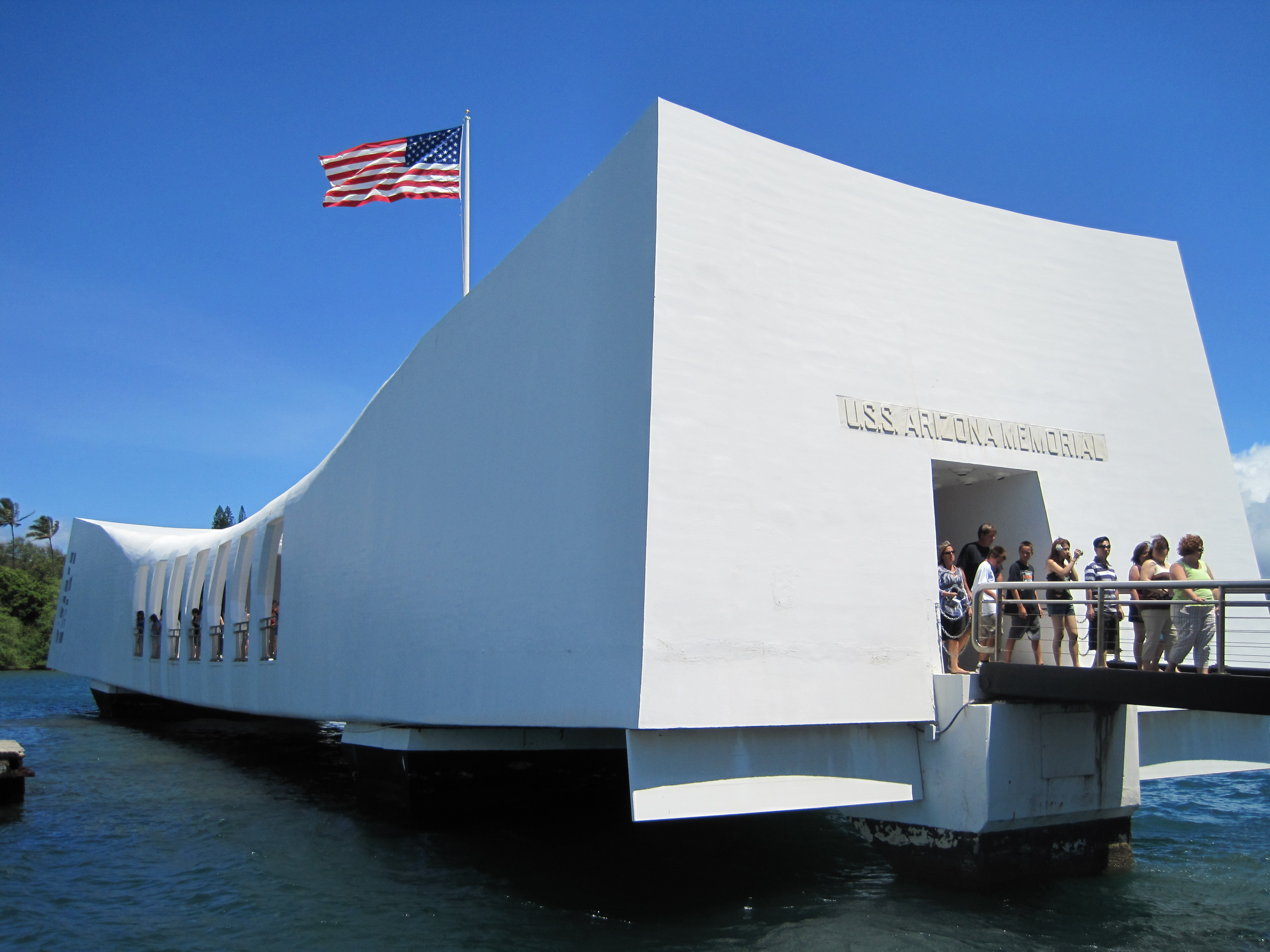
- The USS Arizona Memorial, Pearl Harbor.
- Interactive map of Pearl Harbor National Memorial
- Coordinates: 21°22′1.54″N 157°56′18.86″W
- Area: 21.3 acres (0.086 km^{2})
- Visitors: 1,534,226 (in 2025)
- Website: Pearl Harbor National Memorial

Pearl Harbor National Memorial is a unit of the National Park System of the United States on the island of Oahu, Hawaii. The John D. Dingell Jr. Conservation, Management, and Recreation Act removed the site from the World War II Valor in the Pacific National Monument on March 12, 2019, and made it a separate national memorial.

The site commemorates the events of the attack on Pearl Harbor on December 7, 1941, which killed over 2,400 Americans and sank twelve ships. The site includes the USS Arizona Memorial, the USS Utah memorial, the USS Oklahoma memorial, six chief petty officer bungalows on Ford Island, mooring quays F6, F7, and F8, which formed part of Battleship Row, and the visitor center at Halawa Landing.

A visitor center and park features galleries on the Pacific theater of World War II, a theater showing a film about the attack, and memorial sculpture. Visitors may take a ferry to the Arizona memorial. The USS Arizona Memorial was designed by Austrian-born American architect, Alfred Preis, who was living in Hawaii.

Nearby are the USS Missouri memorial, USS Bowfin museum, and Pearl Harbor Aviation Museum, which are designated historic attractions within the Pearl Harbor Naval Complex.

== See also ==
- List of national memorials of the United States
