= Forest and Rangeland Renewable Resources Planning Act of 1974 =

- Long title: An Act to provide for the Forest Service, Department of Agriculture, to protect, develop, and enhance the productivity and other values of certain of the Nation's lands and resources, and for other purposes.
- Enacted by: the 93rd United States Congress

Citations
- Public law: Pub. L. 93–378
- Statutes at Large: 88 Stat. 476

Legislative history
- Introduced in the Senate as S. 2296 by Hubert Humphrey on July 31, 1973; Passed the Senate on February 21, 1974; Passed the House on July 1, 1974; Signed into law by President Gerald Ford on August 17, 1974

The Forest and Rangeland Renewable Resources Planning Act of 1974 (RPA) (16 U.S.C. §§ 1600 et seq.) is a United States federal law which authorizes long-range planning by the United States Forest Service to protect, develop, and enhance the productivity and other values of forest resources. RPA requires that a renewable resource assessment and a Forest Service plan be prepared every ten and five years, respectively, to plan and prepare for the future of natural resources. RPA was reorganized, expanded, and otherwise amended by the National Forest Management Act of 1976.

== Provisions ==
The Forest and Rangeland Renewable Resources Planning Act of 1974 requires the Secretary of Agriculture to prepare a Renewable Resource Assessment, including:

(1) an analysis of present and anticipated uses, demand for, and supply of the forest and related resources, with consideration of the international forest resource situation, and an analysis of pertinent supply and demand and price relationship trends;

(2) an inventory, based on information available to the Forest Service and other Federal agencies, of present and potential forest and related resources, and an evaluation of opportunities for improving their yield of tangible and intangible goods and services, together with estimates of investment costs and direct and indirect returns to the Federal Government;

(3) a description of Forest Service programs and responsibilities in research, cooperative programs, and management of the National Forest System, their interrelationships, and the relationship of these programs and responsibilities to public and private activities; and

(4) a discussion of important policy considerations, laws, regulations, and other factors expected to significantly influence and affect the use, ownership, and management of forest and related resource lands.

RPA also directs the Secretary of Agriculture to prepare and transmit to the President a recommended Renewable Resource Program displaying alternative objectives and associated programs to provide for the protection, management, and development of the National Forest System. The Program should include, but not be limited to: (1) an inventory of specific needs and opportunities for both public and private program investments; (2) specific identification of program outputs, results anticipated, and benefits associated with investments in such a manner that the anticipated costs can be directly compared with the total related benefits and direct and indirect returns to the Federal Government; and (3) a discussion of priorities for accomplishment of inventoried program opportunities, with specified costs, outputs, results, and benefits.

RPA provides that the Secretary of Agriculture shall utilize information and data available from other Federal, State, and private organization and shall avoid duplication and overlap of resource assessment and program planning efforts of other Federal agencies.

== Legislative history ==
The Forest and Rangeland Renewable Resources Planning Act of 1974 was enacted on August 17, 1974, through Public Law 93–378, entitled "An Act to Provide for the Forest Service, Department of Agriculture, To Protect, Develop, and Enhance the Productivity and Other Values of Certain of the Nation's Lands and Resources, and for Other Purposes."

Public law 93-378 legislative timeline
Date	Action
July 31, 1973	Introduced in Senate
February 21, 1974	Considered and passed Senate
July 1, 1974	Considered and passed House, amended (in lieu of H.R. 15283)
August 1, 1974	House agreed to conference report
August 2, 1974	Senate agreed to conference report
August 17, 1974	Signed by President

=== Amendments ===
The Forest and Rangeland Renewable Resources Planning Act of 1974 has been amended five times since its enactment:

- Public Law 94–588, §§ 2–12, Oct. 22, 1976, 90 Stat. 2949 to 2958 (16 §§ 581h, 1600 to 1614)
- Public Law 95–313, § 12, July 1, 1978, 92 Stat. 374 (16 § 1606)
- Public Law 97–100, Title II, § 201, Dec. 23, 1981, 95 Stat. 1405 (16 § 1608)
- Public Law 101–624, Title XXIV, § 2408, Nov. 28, 1990, 104 Stat. 4061 (16 §§ 1601, 1602)
- Public Law 115–141, Div. O, Title II, § 208, Mar. 23, 2018, 132 Stat. 1065 (16 §§ 1601 to 1607, 1610, 1611, 1613)

=== Proposed amendment ===
Senate Bill 3292 was a proposed amendment in the 115th Congress to modify a provision relating to consultation requirements in the Forest and Rangeland Renewable Resources Planning Act of 1974. The bill was introduced by Senator Steve Daines (R-MT) and referred to the Committee on Environment and Public Works on July 26, 2018. If passed, the amendment would have removed additional consultation requirements with respect to certain new information.

The bill proposed to amend Section 6(d)(2) of the Act (16 U.S.C. 1604(d)(2)) by striking “and” at the end of subparagraph (A)(i), by removing the period and inserting "or" at the end of subparagraph (A)(ii), and by adding the following language: “(iii) any new information (within the meaning of subsection (b) of section 402.16 of title 50, Code of Federal Regulations (or a successor regulation)) relating to a land management plan, if the land management plan has been adopted by the Secretary as of the date on which the new information is revealed.” The bill also proposed to amend the timing requirements within subparagraph (B)(ii).

== Litigation ==
=== Cowpasture River Preservation Association v. Forest Service ===
Petitioners brought action for review of decision of Forest Service, alleging it violated National Forest Management Act, National Environmental Policy Act, and Mineral Leasing Act by issuing a special use permit and record of decision authorizing Atlantic Coast Pipeline, LLC to construct a natural gas pipeline through parts of national forests and the Appalachian National Scenic Trail. The United States Court of Appeals for the Fourth Circuit held that the Forest Service acted arbitrarily and capriciously in violation of National Forest Management Act by concluding that forest planning rule’s substantive requirements were unrelated to purpose of, and thus inapplicable, to national forest plan amendments it made to allow the developer to construct the pipeline through parts of national forests. The amendments lessened protections for soils, riparian areas, and threatened and endangered species, which directly related to the planning rule’s substantive requirements for these same categories, and the amendments’ entire purpose was to weaken existing environmental standards to accommodate the developer’s inability to meet current standards.

=== Bohmker v. Oregon ===
The United States Court of Appeals for the Ninth Circuit held that an Oregon senate bill that temporarily prohibited instream mining that used any form of motorized equipment within certain limited areas including the beds or banks of the waters of the state containing essential indigenous salmon habitat (which included areas on federal land) was a reasonable environmental regulation that did not mandate particular uses of land or prohibit all mining altogether, and thus was not preempted by federal law. The stated purpose of the bill was to regulate the environmental impacts of motorized instream mining, which posed significant risks to state's natural resources, the bill limited only one form of mining in specific areas, and bill allowed motorized instream mining outside of prohibited areas.

=== Biodiversity Associates v. U.S. Forest Service Dept. of Agriculture ===
Plaintiffs (Biodiversity Associates, Friends of the Bow, and Leila Bruno) brought suit against the Forest Service, the Regional Forester, and the Forest Supervisor challenging various timber sales on the Medicine Bow National Forest. Plaintiffs alleged that the 1985 Medicine Bow National Forest Management Plan has not been revised within the fifteen year deadline set out by Congress in 16 U.S.C. § 1604, and that Defendants were following a timber sale schedule not contemplated by the Plan. The United States District Court for the District of Wyoming held that annual monitoring reports specifically concluded that no significant changes had occurred, and thus a revision was unnecessary.
