= RPA Assessment =

An RPA Assessment is the Forest and Rangeland Renewable Resources Planning Act of 1974-mandated (P.L. 93-378; 16 U.S.C. 1600 et seq.) review made by the United States Forest Service.

== Overview ==
The Forest Service conducts a national assessment of renewable resource supplies, demands, and trends, to identify potential problems and opportunities every 10 years. In response to the problems and opportunities identified in the Assessment, the Forest Service prepares a periodic national strategic program plan every five years.
