= FORPLAN =

Computer program for resources and land-use planning

FORPLAN, short for FORest PLANning, is a computer program developed by K. Norman Johnson and others that uses a linear programming model to estimate land management resource outputs pursuant to the National Forest Management Act of 1976. FORPLAN was developed to bridge the gap between functional resource planning and integrated land-use planning. Its primary usefulness was for the heavily timbered forests in the Pacific Northwest and the Southeastern United States. It is available in two versions.

FORPLAN is the outgrowth of a series of LP systems developed and used by the United States Forest Service, including Resource Capability System (RCS), Resource Allocation Analysis (RAA), Timber Resource Allocation Method (Timber RAM), Multiple Use Sustained Yield Calculation Technique (MUSYC), ADVENT (a system used for program budgeting), and Integrated Resource Planning Model (IRPM). As part of its growing centralization, the Forest Service directed all forests to use FORPLAN rather than competing computer models. FORPLAN allowed planners to enter information about the forest into the computer and then inquire as to, e.g., the maximum amount of timber that could be cut or how much timber could be cut in a decade if the forest were managed to earn maximum profits. FORPLAN allowed planners to break forests up into different zones based on factors such as vegetation, age of timber, wildlife habitat, steepness of slope, or whether the zone had roads.

One criticism of FORPLAN is that it is unable to incorporate emotions, preferences or attitudes that are spatially dependent. Another criticism is that it includes nonuse values, such as protecting watersheds, preserving endangered species, and improving aesthetics, only as constraints on production rather than as goals. Other criticisms are its large size and complexity and problems with documentation and verification. It is also limited by its requirements for massive amounts of data on ecological interactions and for market prices for all resource uses and outputs. Randal O'Toole noted that much of the data in FORPLAN was based on outdated inventories and that average FORPLAN timber prices were often two or three times actual prices.

It was praised by the U.S. Congress Office of Technology Assessment for its enormous analytical capacity, its focus on important issues, and its common language for analysts.

The Australian PREPLAN, or Pristine Environment Planning Language and Simulator, was derived partly from FORPLAN.
