= National Forest Management Act of 1976 =

United States federal law

- Long title: To amend the Forest and Rangeland Renewable Resources Planning Act of 1974, and for other purposes.
- Enacted by: the 94th United States Congress

Citations
- Public law: Pub. L. 94-588
- Statutes at Large: 90 Stat. 2949

Legislative history
- Signed into law by President Gerald Ford on October 22, 1976

The National Forest Management Act (NFMA) of 1976 (P.L. 94-588) is a United States federal law that is the primary statute governing the administration of national forests and was an amendment to the Forest and Rangeland Renewable Resources Planning Act of 1974, which called for the management of renewable resources on national forest lands. The law was a response to lawsuits involving various practices in the national forest, including timber harvesting., Zieske v Butz was the lawsuit brought by members of the Pt Baker Association on Prince of Wales Island against the US Forest Service's first environmental impact statement. The suit halted logging on the NW tip of the island which consisted of 400,000 acres and resulted in a call by the timber industry for Congressional action to undo the lawsuit. Representative Foley noted on the floor that six other suits were blocking logging with holdings similar to Zieske v Butz.

== Background ==
The main objectives of NFMA are to require the U.S. Forest Service to develop plans for national forests, set standards for timber sales, and create policies to regulate timber harvesting. The purpose of these objectives is to protect national forests from permanent damages from excessive logging and clear cutting. Congress requires the Forest Service, in conjunction with other applicable agencies, to thoroughly assess, research, and plan for the nation's renewable resource use, the current demand, anticipated demands, and environmental and economic impacts.

NFMA changed forest planning by obliging the United States Forest Service to use a systematic and interdisciplinary approach to resource management. It also provided for public involvement in preparing and revising forest plans. Also, NFMA established and expanded several Forest Service trust funds and special accounts. It expanded upon the land and resource management plans (L/RMPs) outlined in the Forest and Rangeland Renewable Resources Planning Act of 1974 (RPA), and started by requiring the Forest Service to do an inventory of all its lands, followed by a zoning process to see what uses land was best suited for – dubbed the "suitability determination." These plans required alternative land management options to be presented, each of which have potential resource outputs (timber, range, mining, recreation) as well as socio-economic effects on local communities. The Forest Service, in cooperation with the Federal Emergency Management Agency (FEMA), contributed considerable resources to the creation of FORPLAN (a linear programming model used to estimate the land management resource outputs) and IMPLAN to estimate the economic effects of these outputs on local communities.

At the time NFMA was written, there were conflicting interests in regards to proper forest management. The major player of national forest management at the time was the timber industry. In a post World War II economy, the demand for timber skyrocketed with the housing boom and people were recreating on public lands more than ever before. Visitors to national parks rose from 50 million in 1950 to 72 million in 1960. The Sierra Club and other conservation groups were also fighting for preservation of natural landscapes. The Multiple-Use Sustained-Yield Act of 1960 made it clear that the Forest Service had to manage for non-timber values, like recreation, range, watershed, wildlife and fishery purposes, but it was not until NFMA that these uses were embodied by the forest planning process.

== The NFMA planning process ==
The 1982 NFMA Planning Regulations describe a planning process designed to integrate the many interests concerning the forest:

1. Identify issues, concerns, and opportunities (ICOs). State and local agency officials, as well as the public, collaborate to identify current issues as well as possible future issues and concerns. The goal of the planning process is to improve the forest to better serve the public.
2. Develop planning criteria. Three main criteria are used for management actions: public policy criteria or the policy outlined in regulatory and statutory guidelines, process criteria or the accepted standard of data analysis, and decision criteria or the weight assigned to each management action.
3. Collect data and information necessary to address ICOs. Ensure that data collection meets the process criteria standards. Also include data for a 'no action' alternative to use as a control during alternative comparison.
4. Analyze the management situation (AMS). Group land into strata of similar physical features, such as vegetation, wildlife or soil type, to analyze the effects of management actions.
5. Formulate a broad range of alternatives including a 'no action' alternative.
6. Estimate the effects of each alternative on the environment, the economy, and society.
7. Evaluate alternatives by comparing how well each resolves the ICOs. Evaluate each alternative using the planning criteria outlined in step 2.
8. Select a preferred alternative. This is the proposed forest plan. Document the proposal and justify the selection. Explain why other alternatives were not chosen that may have a higher net present value or are more environmentally preferable. Prepare a Record of Decision (ROD) of the plan.
9. Implement the plan by updating all uses of the forest into conformity of the forest plan. Make the proper budget requests for full implementation.
10. Monitor and evaluate the plan by comparing the actual biological effects of the plan to the projections. Make adjustments where necessary.

== Timeline of NFMA ==
According to the National Forest Service, some of the key events in implementation of the act were the following:

1976 – NFMA was enacted.

1979 – First planning regulations established.

1982 – Revised NFMA planning regulations established.

1989 – Comprehensive review conducted on land management of the Forest Service.

1993 – First revision of forest plan conducted.

1997 – A 13-member Committee of Scientists met to analyze and recommend methods for the Forest Service to improve management of national forests and grasslands. Report was released in 1999.

2000 – The 2000 Planning Rule published. The 2000 Planning Rule caused major backlash from the public. A review was conducted by the Department of Agriculture and found that the rule had considerable flaws.

2002 – Forest Service publishes the 2002 Proposed Planning Rule.

2004 – The Forest Service published the Interpretive Rule. The Interpretive Rule clarifies to the public that while a new rule is formulated, the procedures from the 1982 rule are still applicable to forest plans.

2005 – The 2005 Planning Rule was published.

2008 – The 2008 Planning Rule and an EIS on the rule was published.

2009 – The 2008 Planning Rule was overturned by the U.S. District Court for Northern California. The Forest Service was to return to the 2000 rule while new rules are formulated.

2012 – The 2012 Planning Rule was published. The process of formulating this Planning Rule began in 2009.

== Legal battles ==
NFMA has spawned lawsuits regarding the degree of involvement required by both the Forest Service and the public. NFMA does not have a citizen suit provision. Judicial review must fall under the Administrative Procedure Act. Judicial review under NFMA can happen in two common ways: 1) challenges over various forest plans as violating NFMA or 2) judicial review over specific actions or occurrences such as timber sales.

Stein v Barton

In 1990, the Alaska District Court held that the US Forest Service's plan for Prince of Wales Island was arbitrary and capricious for rejecting 100 foot buffer strips on both sides of salmon streams when clearcutting.

Seattle Audubon Society v. Evans

Under statute 16 U.S.C. 1604(h) of NFMA, the Forest Service is required to develop plans with independent scientists that considers biodiversity. The regulation required that planning "provide for diversity of plant and animal communities based on the suitability and capability of the specific land area in order to meet overall multiple-use objectives, and within the multiple-use objectives of a land management plan adopted pursuant to this section, provide, where appropriate, to the degree practicable, for steps to be taken to preserve the diversity of tree species similar to that existing in the region controlled by the plan." This regulation became known as the "viability regulation."

The viability regulation required that habitat of fish and wildlife are managed to hold a healthy population of native species and some "desired" non-native species. Indicator species were chosen for monitoring to ensure habitat conditions are stable.

The Northern Spotted Owl was designated an indicator species in the old growth forests in the Pacific Northwest. In this region, environmental preservation efforts were thoroughly involved throughout the community yet timber harvesting was still a key economic dependency. In 1991, the Seattle Audubon Society v. Evans case maintained that the Forest Service must still comply with NFMA requirements even though the Northern Spotted Owl had been listed "threatened" under Endangered Species Act (ESA). The Forest Service claimed that once the owls became part of the Endangered Species Act's duties, it was then relieved of its own duties to maintain the viability of its population.

Ohio Forestry Association v. Sierra Club

The Sierra Club claimed that the logging practices allowed in the Wayne National Forest in Southeast Ohio were unlawful under NFMA because the Act requires ongoing input and management from the Forest Service. According to the Sierra Club, plan in the Wayne National Forest permitted too much logging and clearcutting. The Court rejected the claims of the Sierra Club and stated the Forest Service is not an agency required to perform ongoing action or involvement in the forest plans. Justice Breyer concluded that the "controversy is not yet ripe for judicial review."

Sierra Club v. Marita, 1995

The Forest Service issued two land and resource management plans for national forests in Wisconsin that both involved timber harvest. To monitor ecosystem health, the Forest Service chose a handful of management indicator species as proxies, but the Sierra Club argued that a mosaic-like logging of the national forests would not provide the wildlife corridor necessary to ensure appropriate biodiversity of those species or any others. The Sierra Club attacked the Forest Service's science behind their L/RMP, calling it "junk science". Ultimately, the court ruled in favor of agency discretion despite finding that the Forest Service used questionable science, though not to the degree that their decision could be considered arbitrary and capricious under the Administrative Procedure Act (APA).

Big Thorne Project

Environmental groups claimed that the Forest Service violated National Environmental Policy Act (NEPA) and NFMA, and the 2008 Amended Tongass National Forest Land and Resource Management Plan. The Big Thorne Project involved allowance of logging of old growth forests and construction of new roads in the Tongass National Forest. The court rejected claims from environmental groups, saying that the Forest Service's assessments and actions were reasonable.
