= USS Arizona Memorial =

Shipwreck near Pearl Harbor, Hawaii

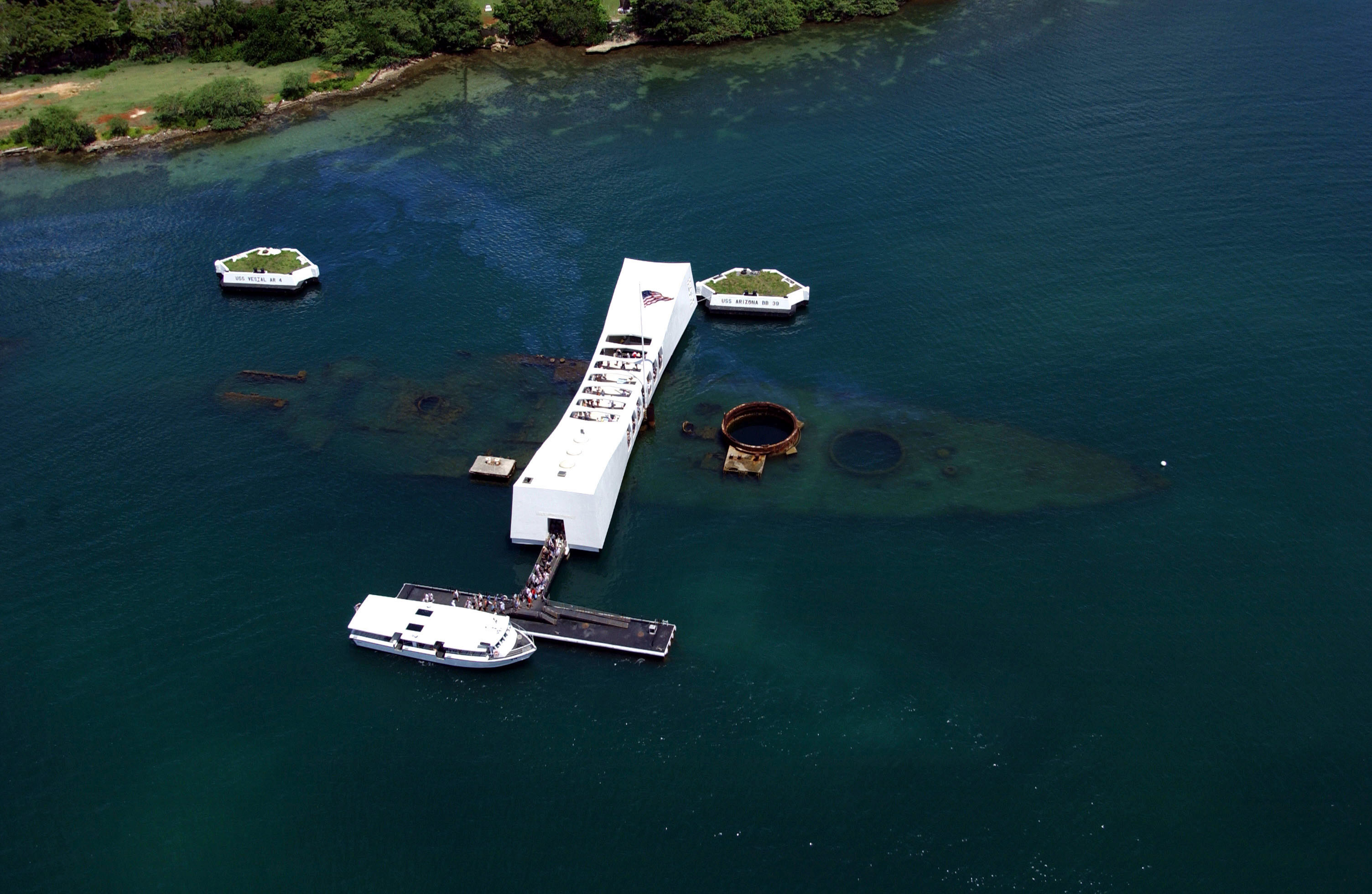
- USS Arizona Memorial in 2002

- Location within Hawaii
- Location: Pearl Harbor
- Nearest city: Honolulu, Hawaii
- Coordinates: 21°21′54″N 157°57′0″W
- Area: 10.50 acres (4.25 ha)
- Established: May 30, 1962; 64 years ago
- Visitors: 1,556,808 (in 2005)
- Governing body: U.S. Navy; National Park Service
- Website: Pearl Harbor National Memorial

The USS Arizona Memorial, at Pearl Harbor in Honolulu, Hawaii, marks the resting place of 1,102 of the 1,177 sailors and Marines killed on USS Arizona during the attack on Pearl Harbor on December 7, 1941, and commemorates the events of that day. The attack on Pearl Harbor led to the United States' involvement in World War II.

The memorial, built in 1962, is visited by more than two million people annually. Accessible only by boat, it straddles the sunken hull of the battleship without touching it. Historical information about the attack, shuttle boats to and from the memorial, and general visitor services are available at the associated USS Arizona Memorial Visitor Center, which opened in 1980 and is operated by the National Park Service. The battleship's sunken remains were declared a National Historic Landmark on May 5, 1989.

The USS Arizona Memorial is one of several sites in Hawaii that are part of the Pearl Harbor National Memorial.

== Memorial ==
=== Conception and funding ===
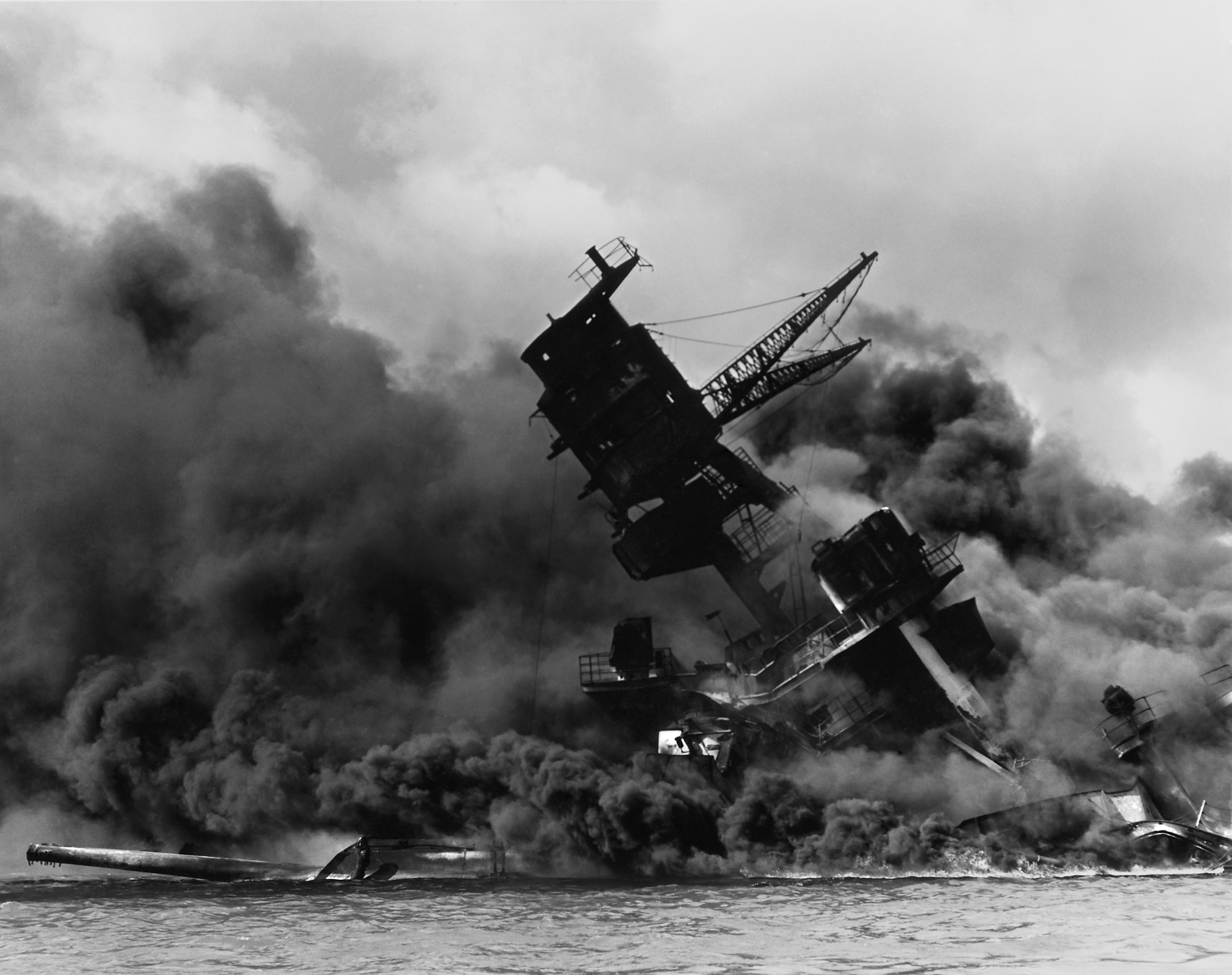
USS Arizona sinking and burning during the attack on Pearl Harbor, December 7, 1941

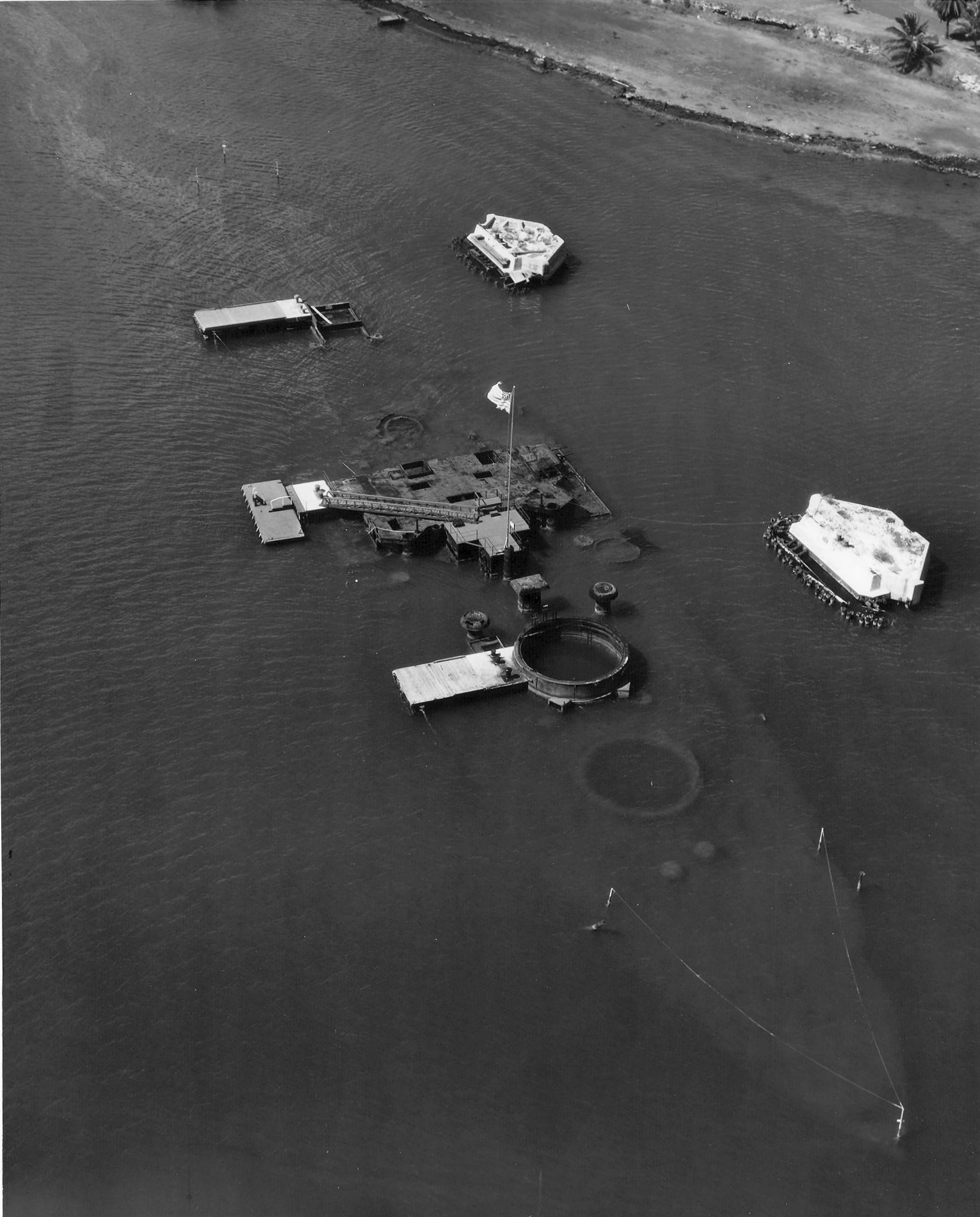
USS Arizona in the 1950s.

During and following the end of World War II, Arizona's wrecked superstructure was removed and efforts began to erect a memorial at the remaining submerged hull.

Robert Ripley, of Ripley's Believe It or Not! fame, visited Pearl Harbor in 1942. Six years later, in 1948, he did a radio broadcast from Pearl Harbor. Following that broadcast, with the help of his longtime friend Doug Storer, he got in contact with the Department of the Navy. He wrote letters to Rear Admiral J.J. Manning of the Bureau of Yards and Docks regarding his desire for a permanent memorial.

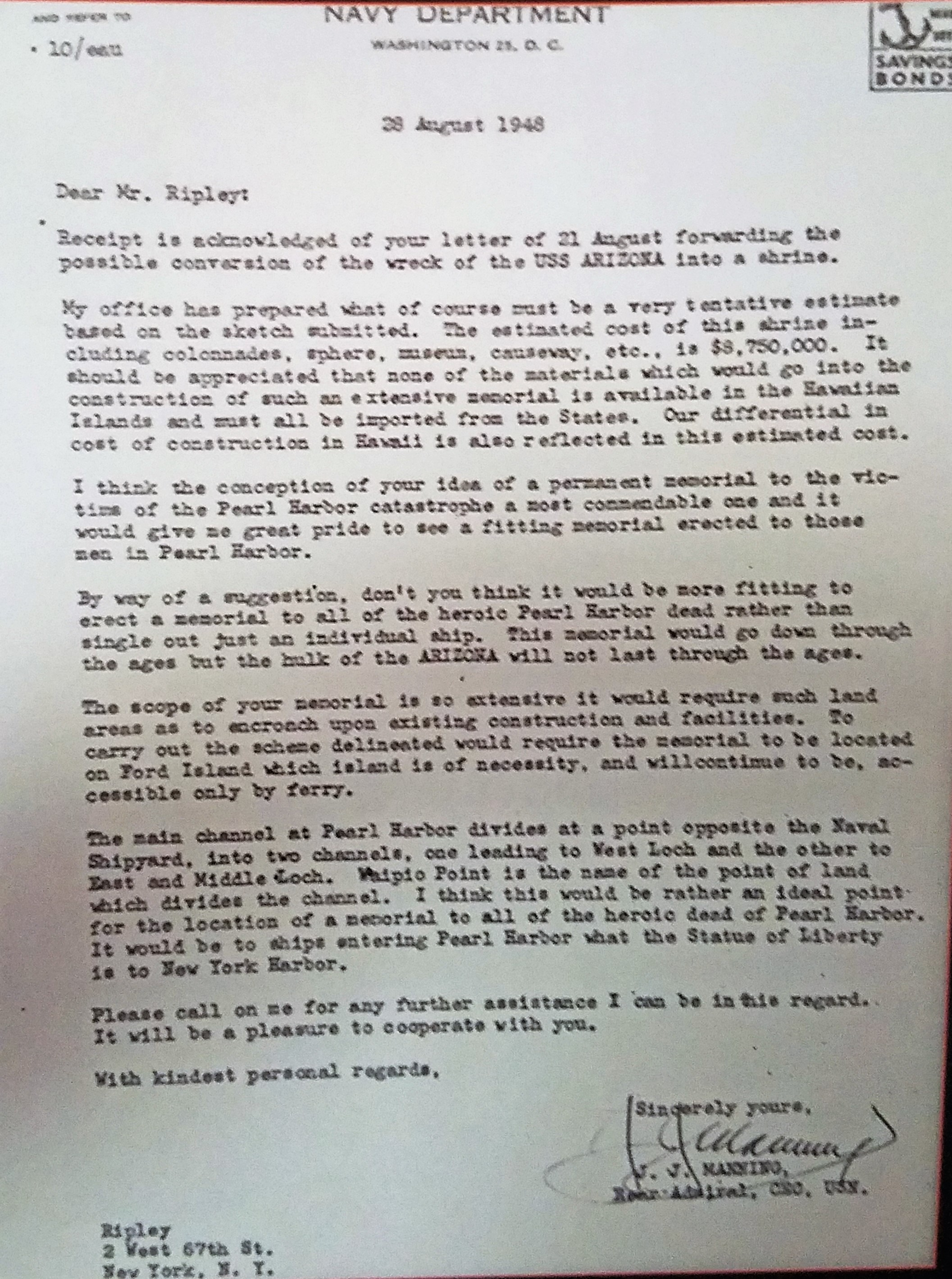
A letter RAdm J.J. Manning to Robert Ripley regarding the need for a permanent Pearl Harbor memorial

While Ripley's original idea for a memorial was disregarded due to the cost, the Navy continued with the idea of creating a memorial. The Pacific War Memorial Commission was created in 1949 to build a permanent memorial in Hawaii. Admiral Arthur W. Radford, commander of the Pacific Fleet, attached a flag pole to the main mast of the Arizona in 1950, and began a tradition of hoisting and lowering the flag. In that same year a temporary memorial was built above the remaining portion of the deckhouse. Radford requested funds for a national memorial in 1951 and 1952, but was denied because of budget constraints during the Korean War.

The Navy placed the first permanent memorial, a 10-foot (3 m)-tall basalt stone and plaque, over the mid-ship deckhouse on December 7, 1955. President Dwight D. Eisenhower approved the creation of a National Memorial in 1958. Enabling legislation required the memorial, budgeted at $500,000, be privately financed; however, $200,000 of the memorial cost was government subsidized.

Principal contributions to the memorial included:

- $50,000 Territory of Hawaiʻi initial contribution in 1958
- $95,000 privately raised following a 1958 This Is Your Life television segment featuring Rear Admiral (ret.) Samuel G. Fuqua, Medal of Honor recipient and the senior surviving officer from the Arizona
- $64,000 from a March 25, 1961 benefit concert by Elvis Presley, which was his final live performance until 1968
- $40,000 from the sale of plastic models of the Arizona, in a partnership between the Fleet Reserve Association and Revell Model Company
- $150,000 from federal funds in legislation initiated by Hawaii Senator Daniel Inouye in 1961

During planning stages, the memorial's purpose was the subject of competing visions. Some were eager to keep it a tribute to the sailors of the Arizona, while others expected a dedication to all who died in the Pacific theater. In the end, the legislation authorizing and funding the memorial (HR 44, 1961) declared that the Arizona would "be maintained in honor and commemoration of the members of the Armed Forces of the United States who gave their lives to their country during the attack on Pearl Harbor, Hawaii, on December 7, 1941."

=== Design ===
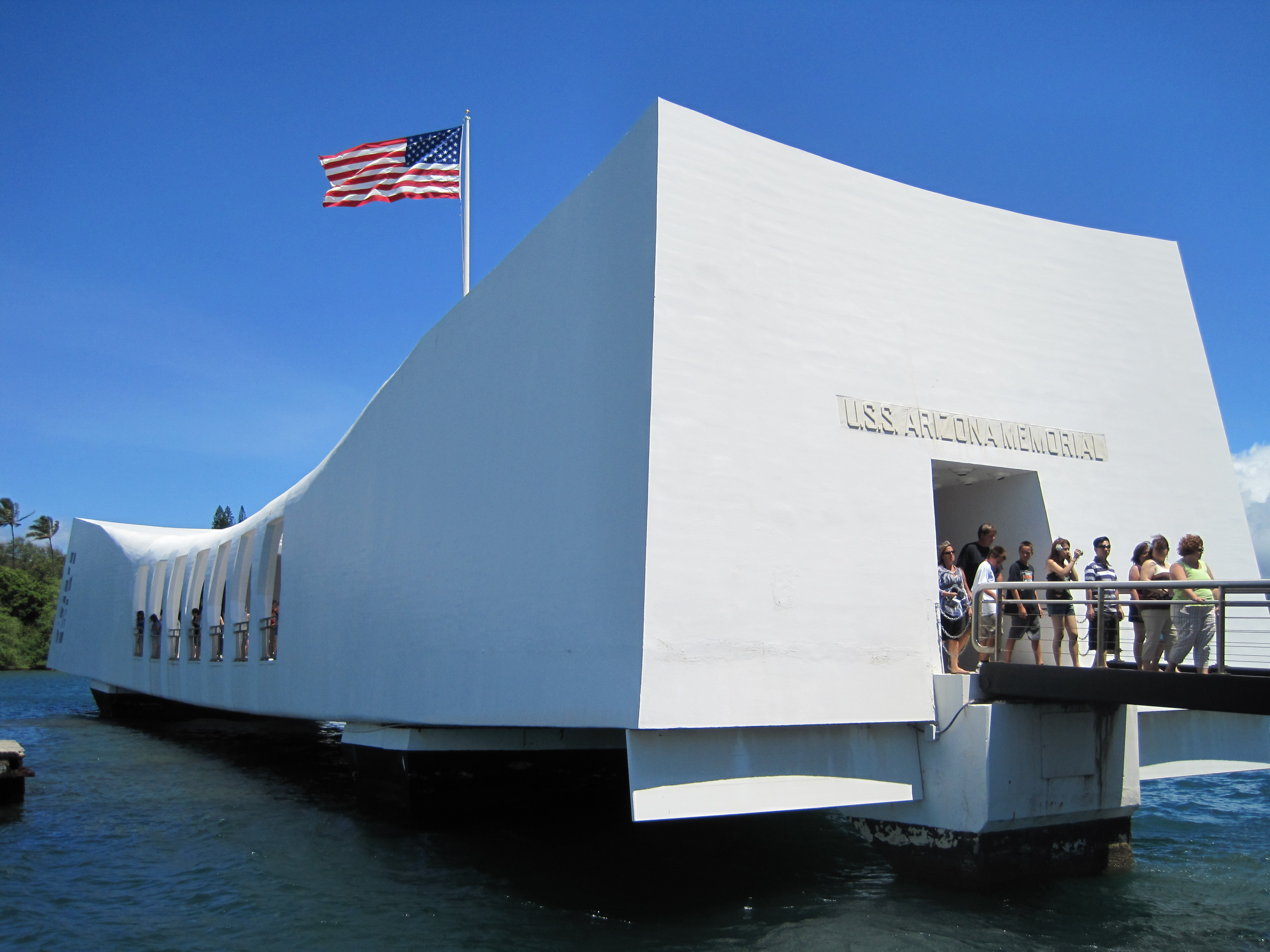
Exterior view

The national memorial was designed by Honolulu architect Alfred Preis, who was detained at Sand Island at the start of the war as an enemy of the country, because of his Austrian birth. The United States Navy specified the memorial be in the form of a bridge floating above the ship and accommodating 200 people.

The 184-foot-long (56 m) structure has two peaks at each end connected by a sag in the center of the structure. Critics initially called the design a "squashed milk carton".

The architecture of the USS Arizona Memorial is explained by Preis as, "Wherein the structure sags in the center but stands strong and vigorous at the ends, expresses initial defeat and ultimate victory ... The overall effect is one of serenity. Overtones of sadness have been omitted, to permit the individual to contemplate his own personal responses ... his innermost feelings."

=== Description ===
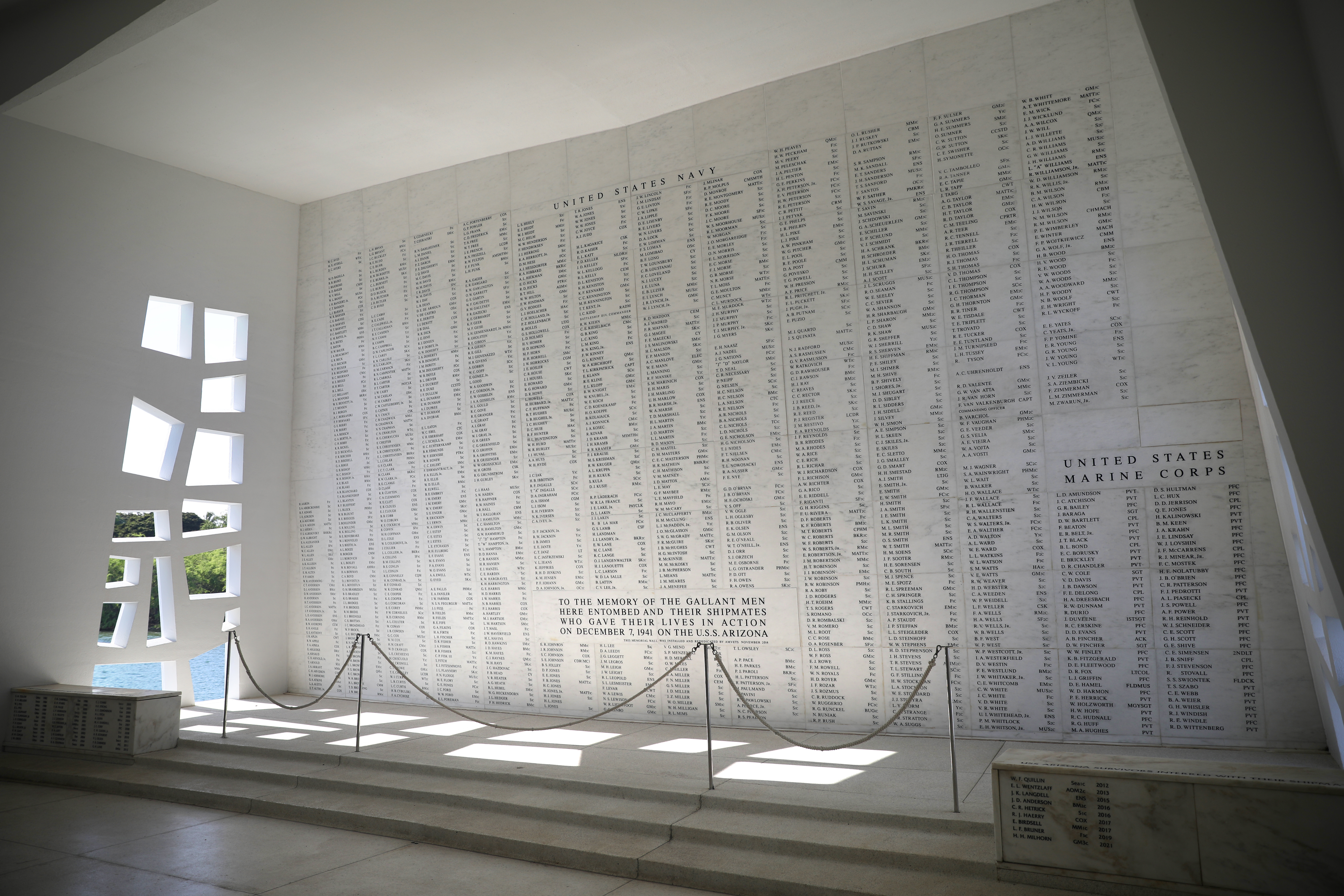
"To the Memory of the Gallant Men Here Entombed and their shipmates who gave their lives in action on December 7, 1941, on the U.S.S. Arizona" — inscription in marble with the names of Arizona's honored dead

The national memorial has three main parts: entry, assembly room, and shrine. The central assembly room features seven large open windows on either wall and ceiling, to commemorate the date of the attack. There are rumors that the 21 windows symbolically represent a 21-gun salute or 21 Marines standing at eternal parade rest over the tomb of the fallen, but guides at the site have confirmed that this was not the architect's intention. The memorial also has an opening in the floor overlooking the sunken decks. It is from this opening that visitors can pay their respects by tossing flowers in honor of the fallen sailors. In the past, leis were tossed in the water, but because string from leis poses a hazard to sea life, leis now are placed on guardrails in front of the names of the fallen.

One of Arizona's three 19,585-pound (8,884 kg) anchors is displayed at the visitor center's entrance. (One of the other two is at the Arizona State Capitol in Phoenix.) One of the two ship's bells is in the visitor center. (Its twin is in the clock tower of the Student Memorial Center at the University of Arizona in Tucson.)

The shrine at the far end is a marble wall that bears the names of all those killed on Arizona, protected behind velvet ropes. To the left of the main wall is a small plaque which bears the names of thirty or so crew members who survived the 1941 sinking. Any surviving crew members of Arizona (or their families on their behalf) could have their ashes interred within the wreck by U.S. Navy divers. (The last survivor of Arizona, Lou Conter, died in April 2024 at the age of 102.)

=== History ===
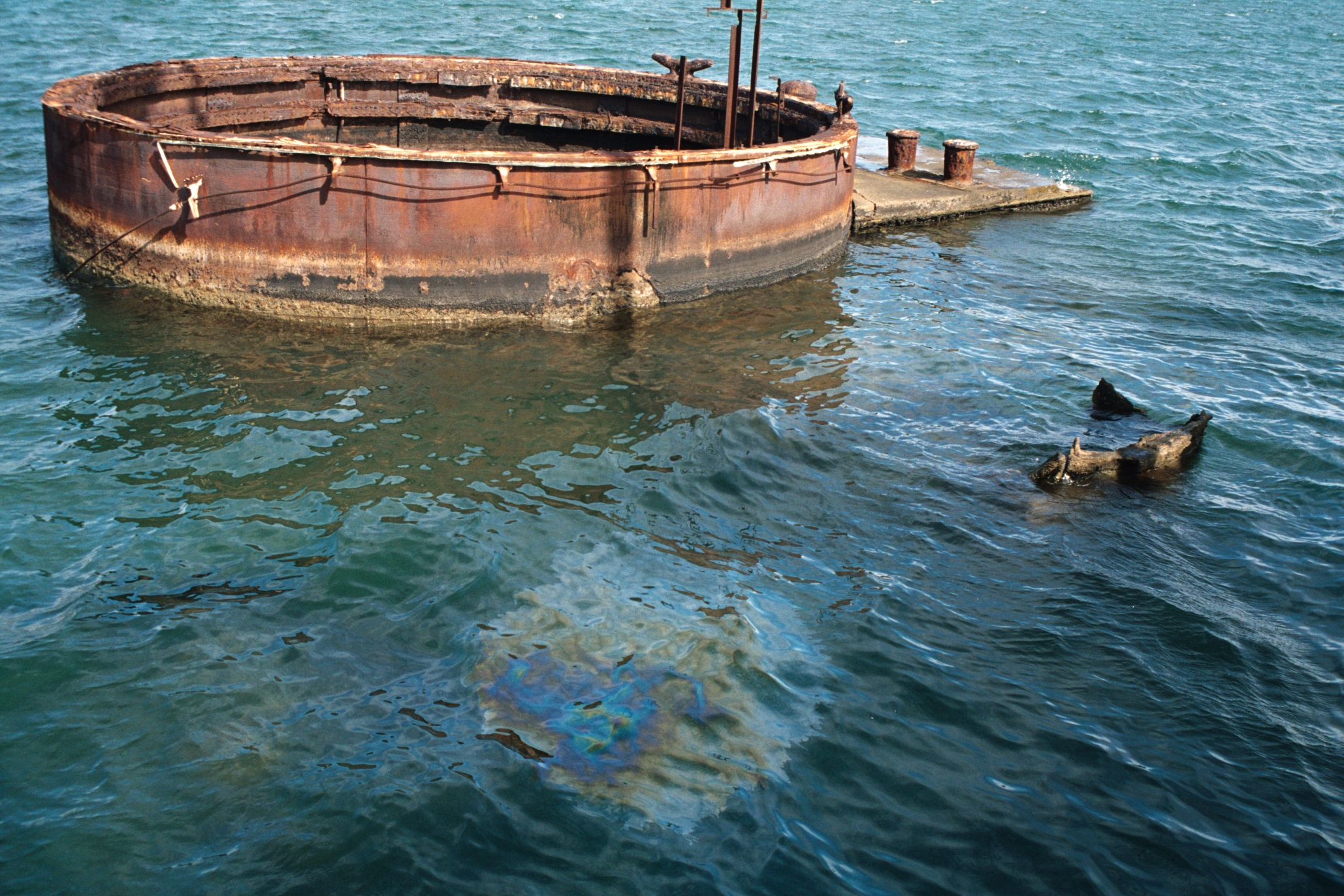
The "tears of the Arizona". Oil slick visible on water's surface above the sunken battleship.

The USS Arizona Memorial was formally dedicated on May 30, 1962 (Memorial Day) by Texas Congressman and Chairman of Veteran Affairs Olin E. Teague and future-Governor John A. Burns.

It was listed on the National Register of Historic Places on October 15, 1966. While the wreck of the Arizona was declared a National Historic Landmark in 1989, the memorial does not share this status. Rather, it is listed separately from the wreck on the National Register of Historic Places. The joint administration of the memorial by the United States Navy and the National Park Service was established on September 9, 1980.

Oil leaking from the sunken battleship can still be seen rising from the wreckage to the water's surface. This oil is sometimes referred to as "the tears of the Arizona" or "black tears". In a National Geographic feature published in 2001, concerns were expressed that the continued deterioration of the Arizona's bulkheads and oil tanks from saltwater corrosion could pose a significant environmental threat from a rupture, resulting in a significant release of oil. The National Park Service states it has an ongoing program that closely monitors the submerged vessel's condition.

The Park Service, as part of its Centennial Initiative celebrating its 100th anniversary in 2016, developed a "mobile park" to tour the continental United States to increase exposure of the park. The mobile park also collected oral histories of the attack on Pearl Harbor.

=== Maintenance ===
The marble wall is vulnerable to the presence of salt water vapor which causes stains and erosion damage to gradually appear. The original wall was replaced in 1984 and the first replacement wall was replaced in 2014.

== USS Missouri ==
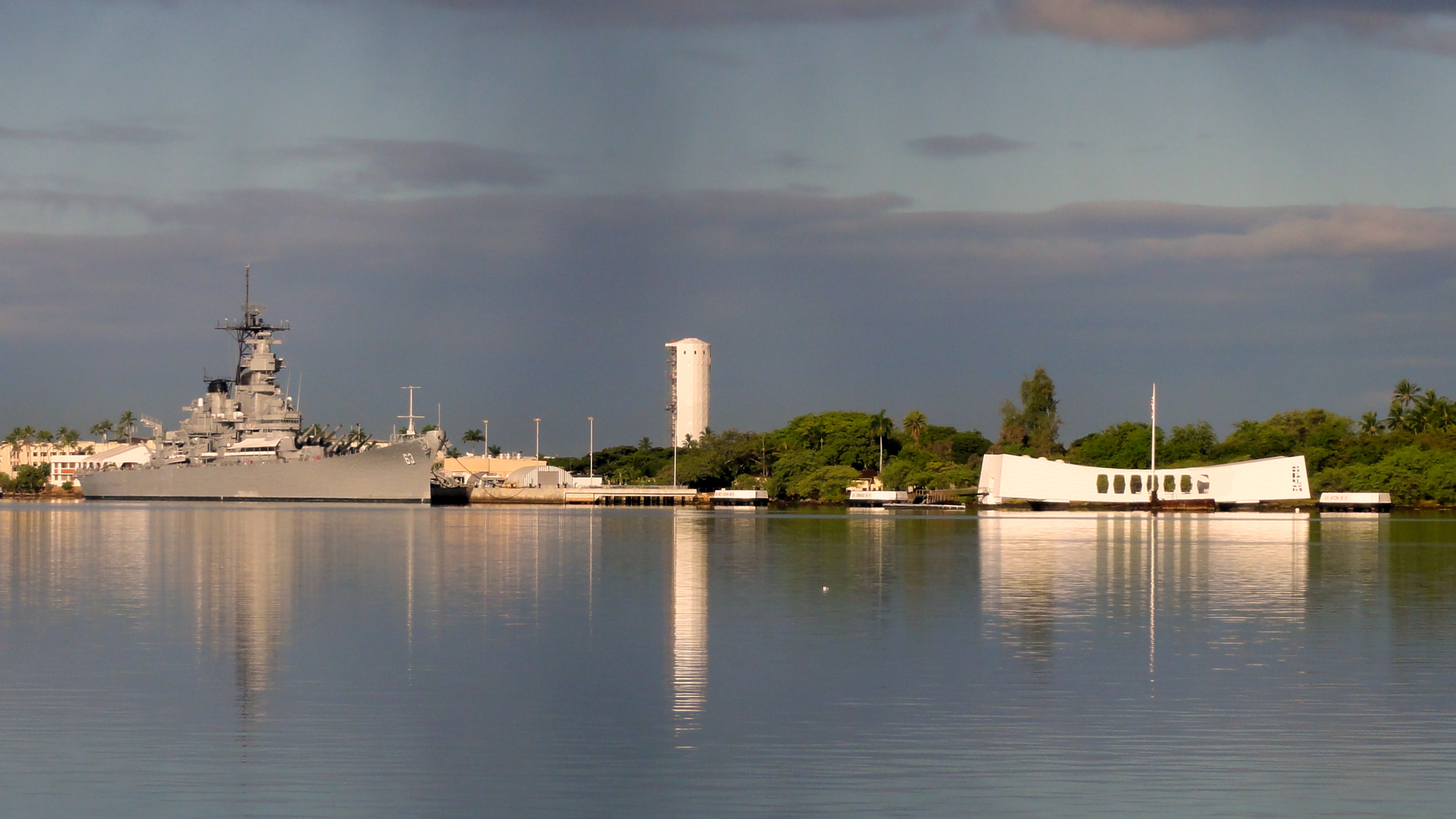
The USS Missouri and USS Arizona memorials.

Upon the deck of the battleship USS Missouri in Tokyo Bay, the Japanese surrendered to United States General Douglas MacArthur and Admiral Chester W. Nimitz, ending World War II. In 1999, Missouri was moved to Pearl Harbor from the United States west coast and docked behind, and in line, with USS Arizona, placing it perpendicular to the USS Arizona Memorial. The pairing of the two ships became an evocative symbol of the beginning and end of the United States' participation in the war.

USS Arizona Memorial staff initially criticized the placement of Missouri, saying the large battleship would "overshadow" the Arizona Memorial. To guard against this perception, Missouri was placed well back of the Arizona Memorial, and positioned in Pearl Harbor to prevent those participating in military ceremonies on Missouri's aft decks from seeing the Arizona Memorial. The decision to have Missouri's bow face the Memorial was intended to convey that Missouri now watches over the remains of Arizona so that those interred within Arizona's hull may rest in peace. These measures have helped preserve the identities of the Arizona Memorial and the USS Missouri, thereby improving the public's perception of having Arizona and Missouri in the same harbor.

== Visits ==
=== By the public ===
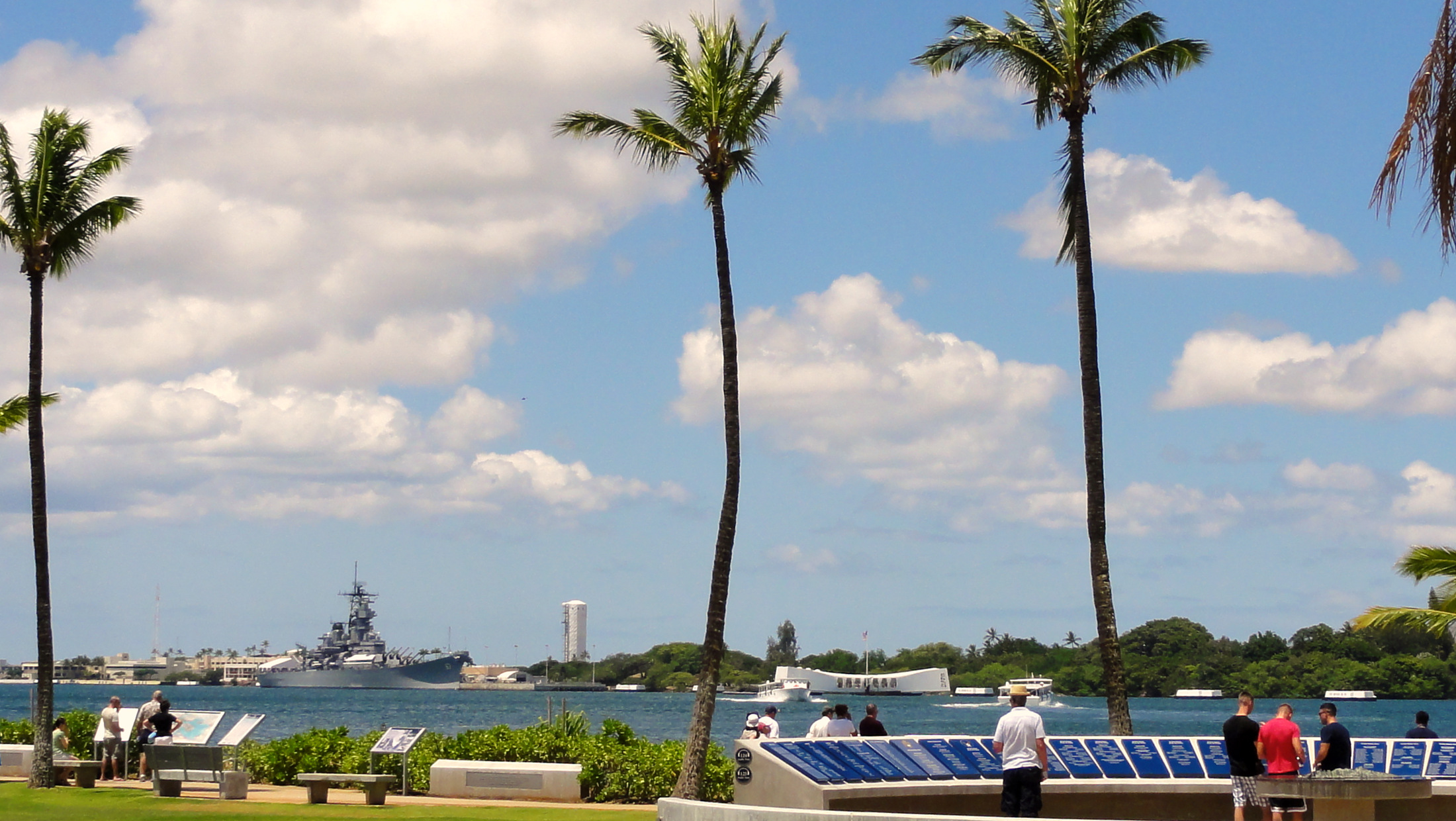
An observation site with interpretive materials; Battleship Row is in the distance

The visitor center operated by the National Park Service is free to the public and has a museum with exhibits about the Pearl Harbor attack, such as the ship's bell from Arizona.

More than one million people visit the memorial each year. Access to the USS Arizona Memorial is by U.S. Navy boat, for which an online reservation is required (in-person reservations were discontinued in February 2021, due to the COVID-19 pandemic). Because of the large number of visitors and the limited number of boat departures, most of the reservations available each day are often fully allocated weeks in advance, although a limited number are held back for release the day before. Touring of the Memorial is self-guided. Visitors may also view a 23-minute documentary film depicting the attack on Pearl Harbor, which is separate from the Memorial tour. The National Park Service web site provides visitor information, including hours of operation and ticketing advisories.

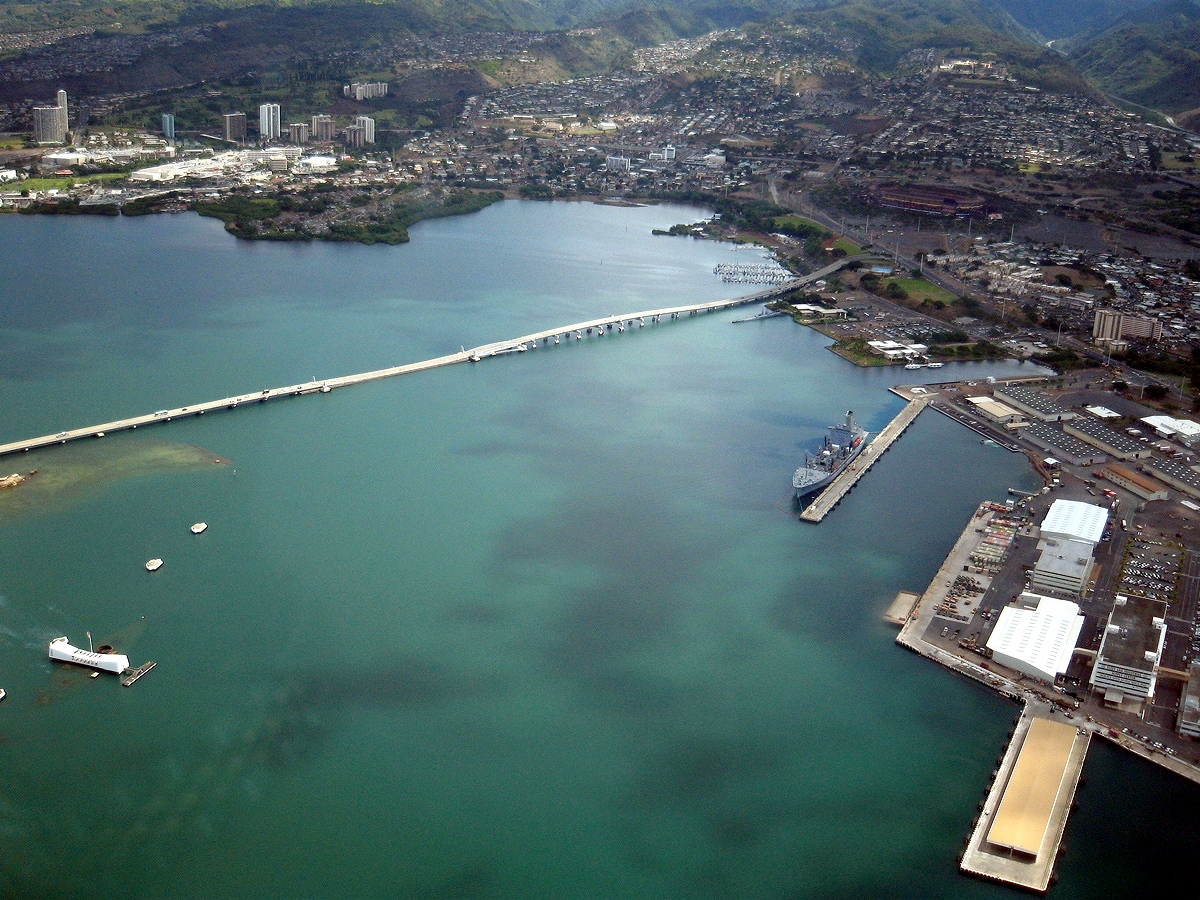
USS Arizona and museum (center left) and the Admiral Clarey Bridge

A one-hour audio tour of the Memorial and Center exhibits, narrated by actress Jamie Lee Curtis, whose father, Tony Curtis was a World War II and Navy veteran, is available for rent at the visitor center. On the center's grounds along the shoreline are more exhibits and a "Remembrance Circle". Nearby is USS Bowfin, a World War II diesel submarine, which may be toured with separate, paid admission. The battleship USS Missouri and the Pacific Aviation Museum Pearl Harbor may also be visited, but require a bus ride to Ford Island.

On May 6, 2018, boat transportation to the memorial was suspended after one of the vessel operators noticed a crack on its outside. Although repairs were made, the cracks reappeared. The memorial was closed on May 26, 2018, and remained closed until September 1, 2019, but boat tours around the memorial and the other ships on Battleship Row continued to be made. The memorial briefly closed again in September and December of 2021 due to safety issues with the dock.

=== By politicians ===
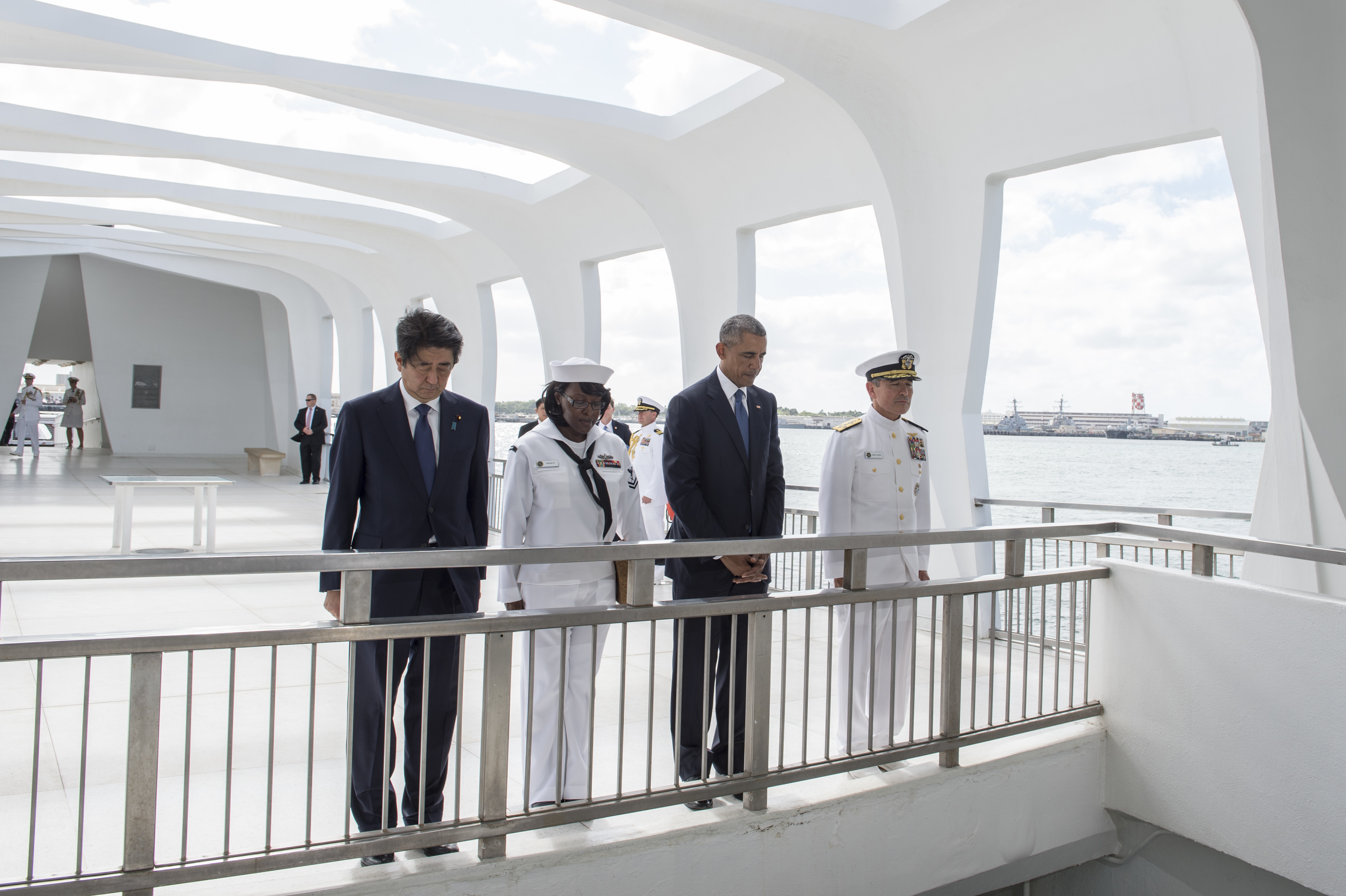
USINDOPACOM Commander Admiral Harry B. Harris Jr., U.S. president Barack Obama, Japanese prime minister Shinzō Abe, and a U.S. Navy sailor at the Memorial, 27 December 2016.

Since it was formally dedicated in 1962, every U.S. president has made a pilgrimage to the memorial, presenting a wreath and scattering flowers over Arizona in honor of the Americans who perished there. On December 27, 2016, Japanese prime minister Shinzō Abe visited the memorial with President Barack Obama and paid respects to fallen service members there. Abe is the first prime minister of Japan to visit the USS Arizona Memorial, 75 years after the Japanese attack. It was a reciprocal visit to Obama's visit of Hiroshima Peace Memorial on May 27, 2016, as the first visit by a sitting U.S. president. When Abe planned the visit, he mistakenly thought he would be the first sitting prime minister to visit Pearl Harbor, not knowing three of his predecessors paid quiet but official visits in 1951, 1956 and 1957, including his grandfather in 1957. To ensure Abe's visit would be unprecedented, the USS Arizona Memorial was chosen.

In the summer of 2025 FBI Director Kash Patel snorkeled around the ship's wreckage.

== Honors ==
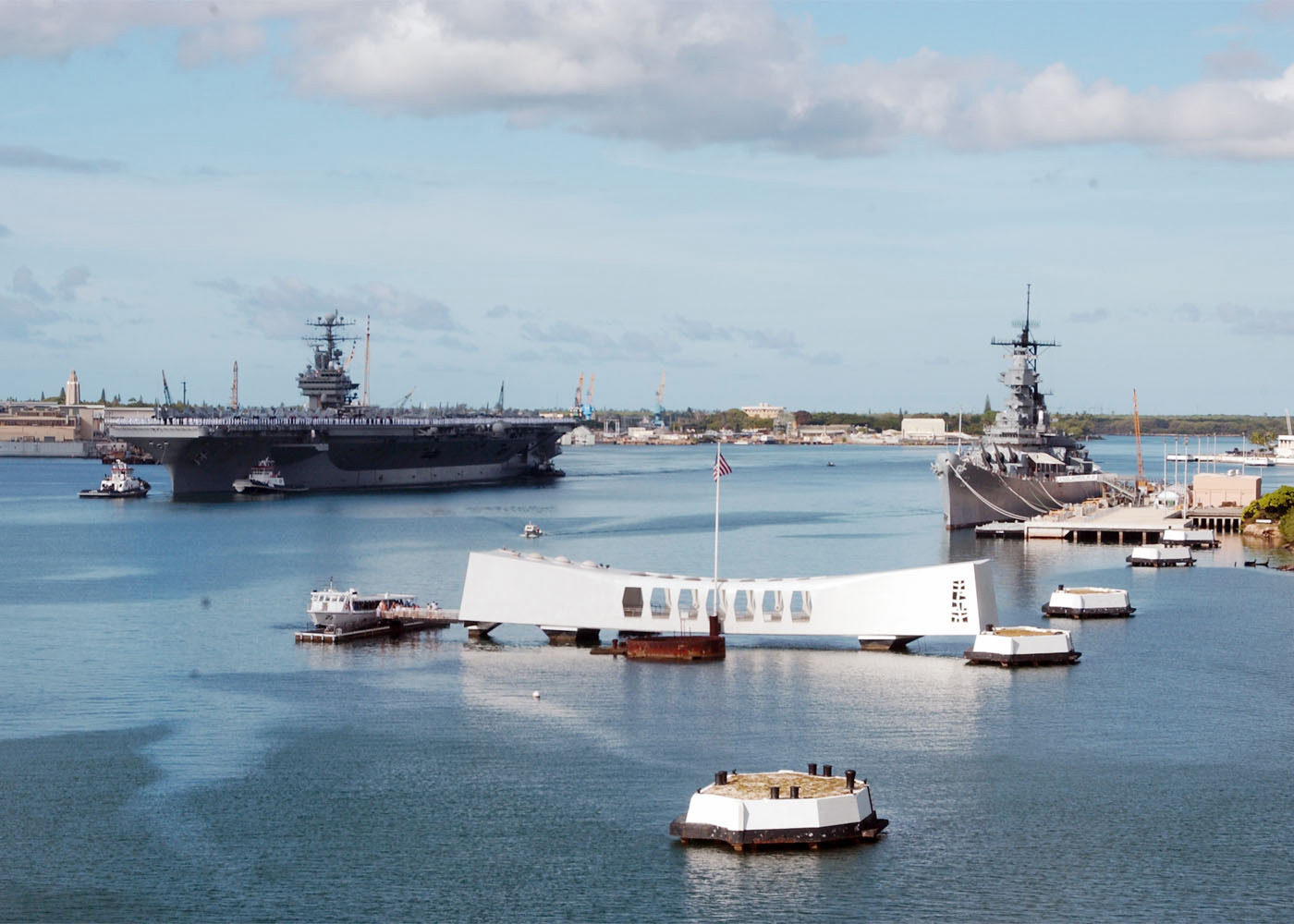
Crew of USS Abraham Lincoln (left) manning the rails near USS Missouri and the USS Arizona Memorial

Every United States Navy, Coast Guard, and Merchant Marine vessel entering Pearl Harbor participates in the tradition of "manning the rails". Personnel serving on these ships stand at attention at the ship's guard rails and salute the USS Arizona Memorial in solemn fashion as their ship slowly glides into port.

Arizona is no longer in commission, but is an active U.S. military cemetery. As survivors of the attack on Arizona died, many chose either to have their ashes scattered in the water over the ship, or to have their urns placed within the well of the barbette of Turret No. 4. As a special tribute to the ship and her lost crew, the United States flag flies from the flagpole, which is attached to the severed mainmast of the sunken battleship. The USS Arizona National Memorial was one of the nine major historical sites incorporated into the wide-ranging World War II Valor in the Pacific National Monument, established by Congress in 2008 and dedicated on December 7, 2010. The John D. Dingell Jr. Conservation, Management, and Recreation Act divided the monument by the three states in which it was located, naming the Hawaii site as Pearl Harbor National Memorial.

== Gallery ==
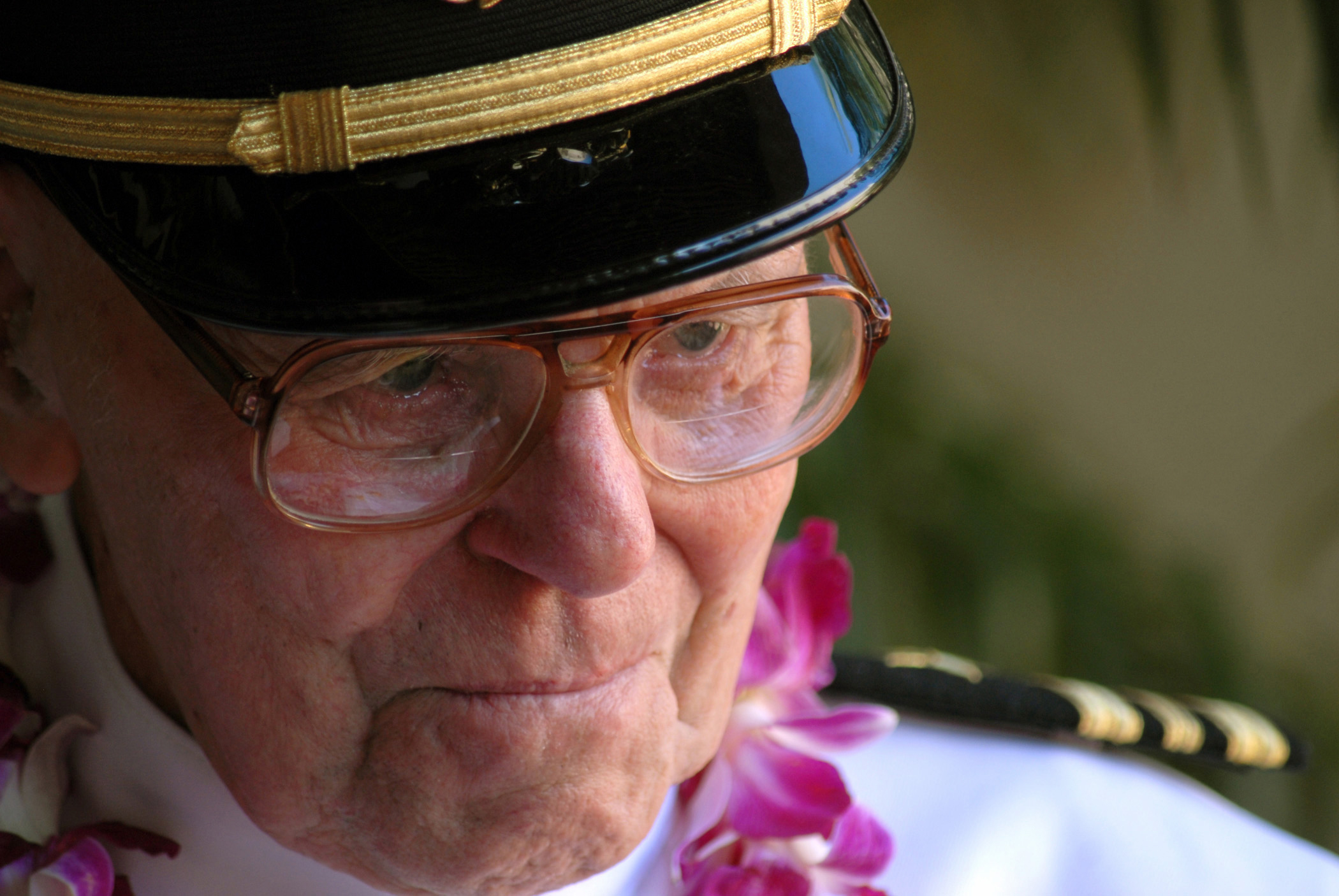
December 2006: 65 years after the attack on Pearl Harbor, retired Lieutenant Commander Joseph Langdell, a USS Arizona survivor, recalls the experience at the memorial

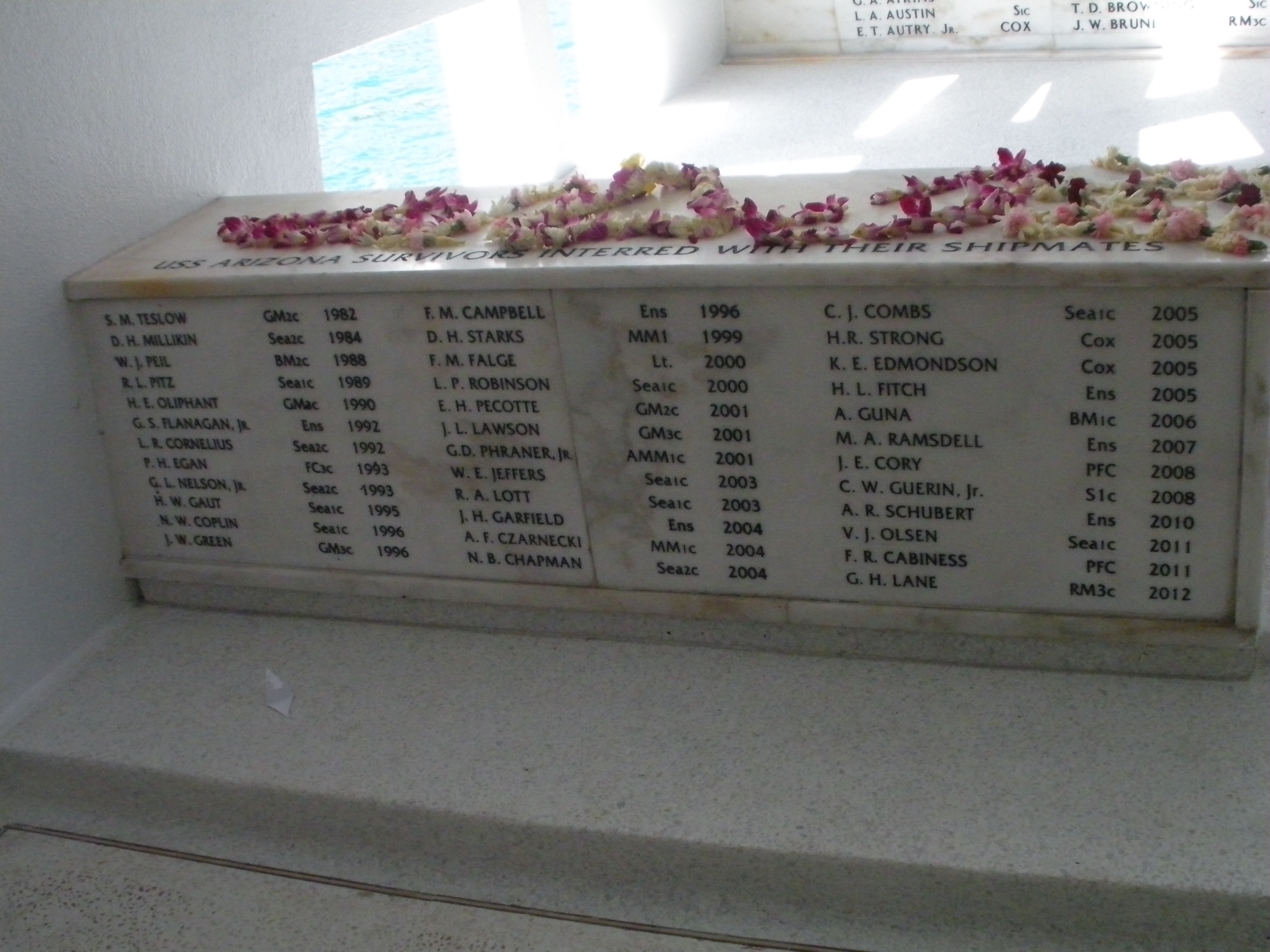
Aboard the Memorial - List of USS Arizona survivors who were later cremated, and their urns were placed into the wreckage by Navy SEALs. (10/2012)

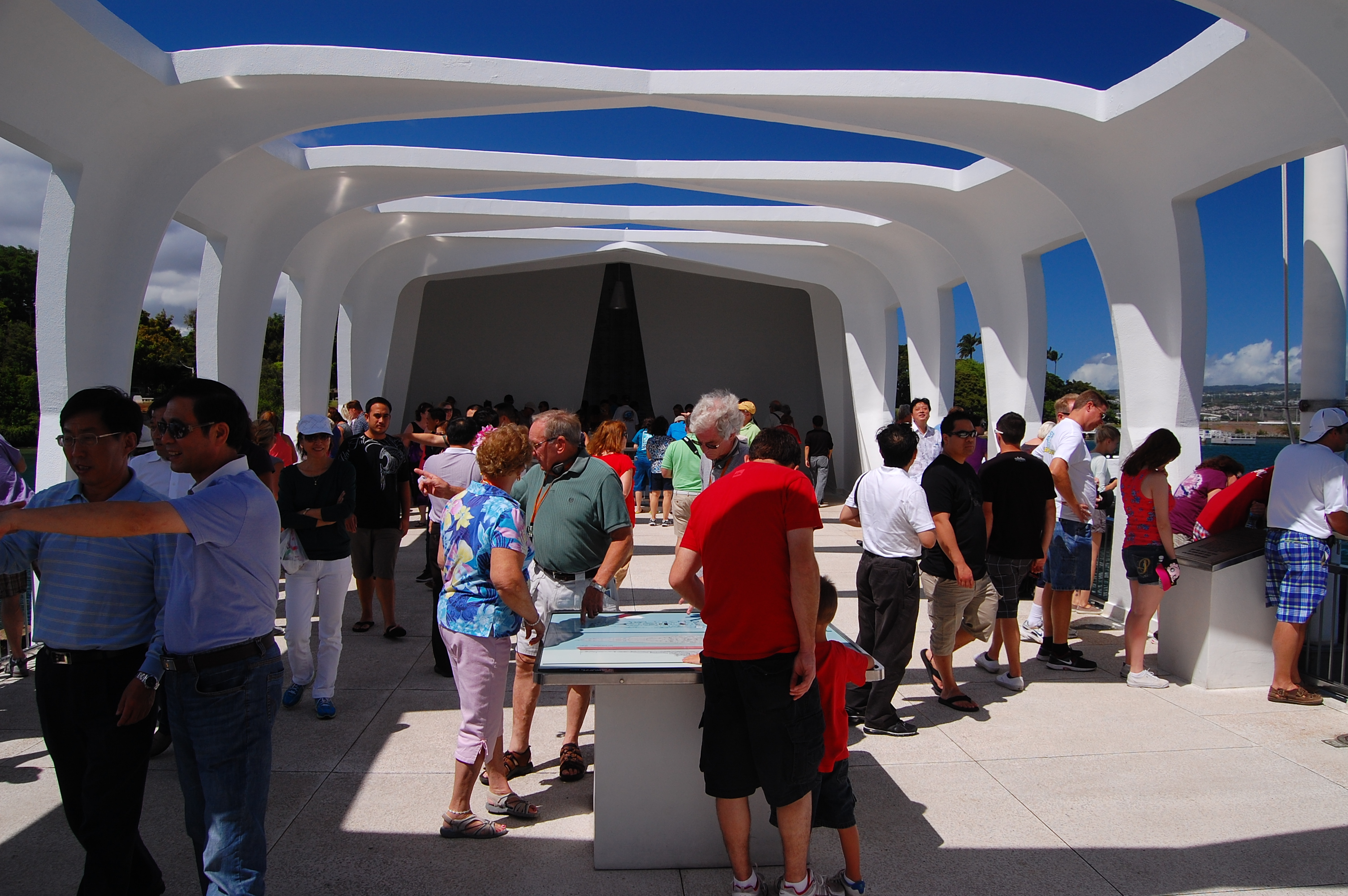
Aboard the USS Arizona Memorial - center gallery. (10/2012)

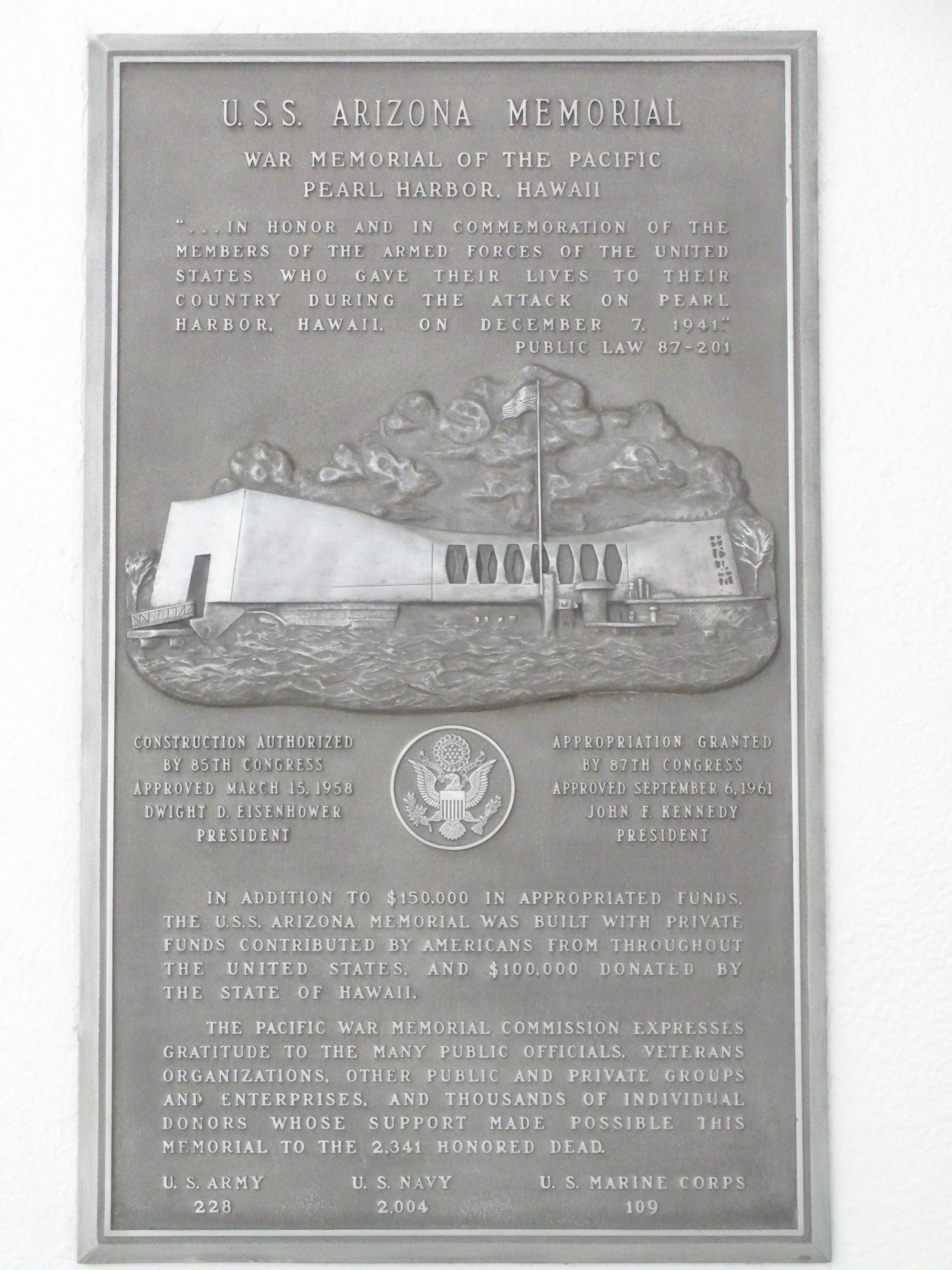
Memorial Plaque - with a relief of the floating walkway. (10/2012)

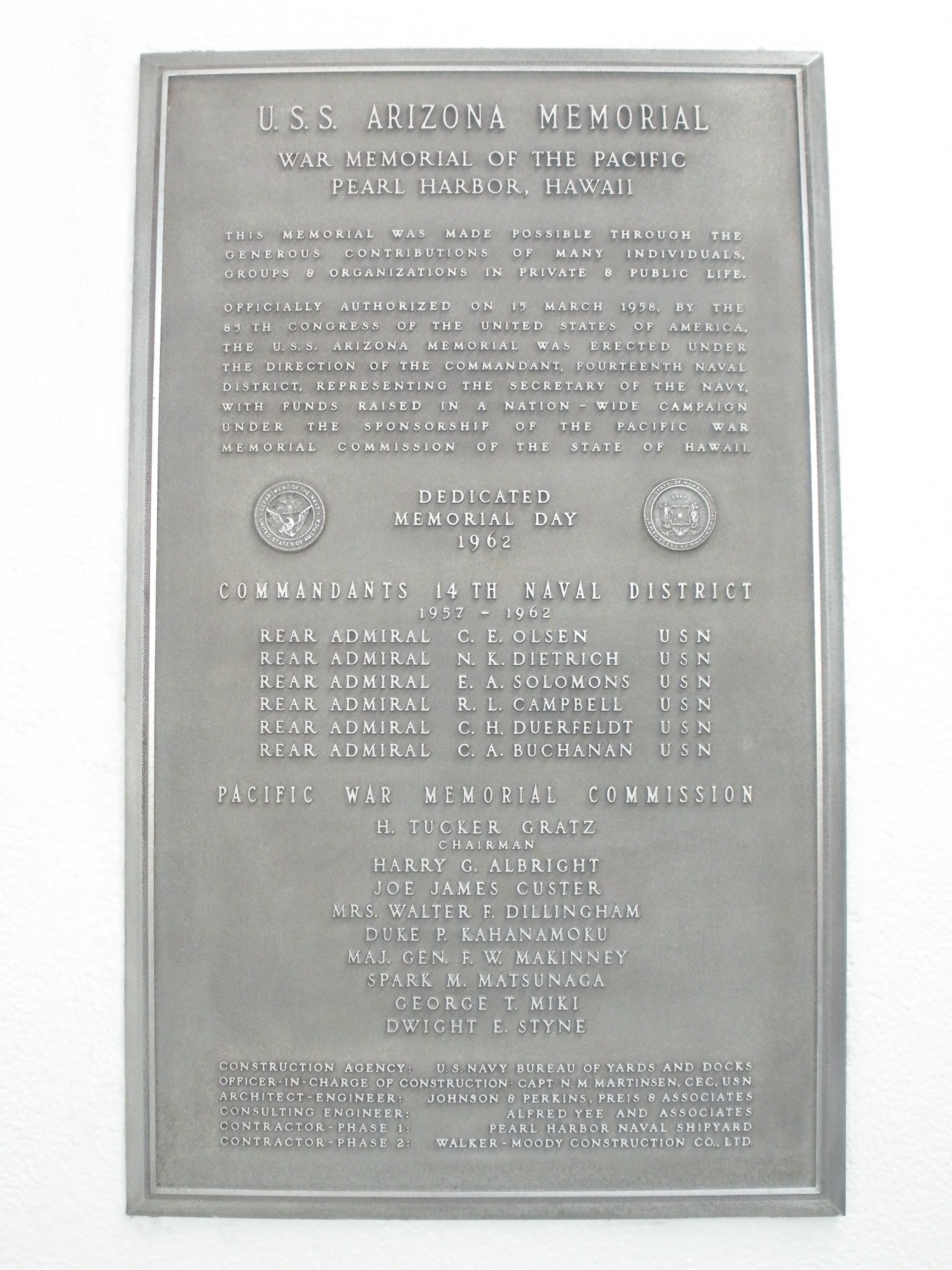
Memorial Plaque - Dedicated 1962. (10/2012)

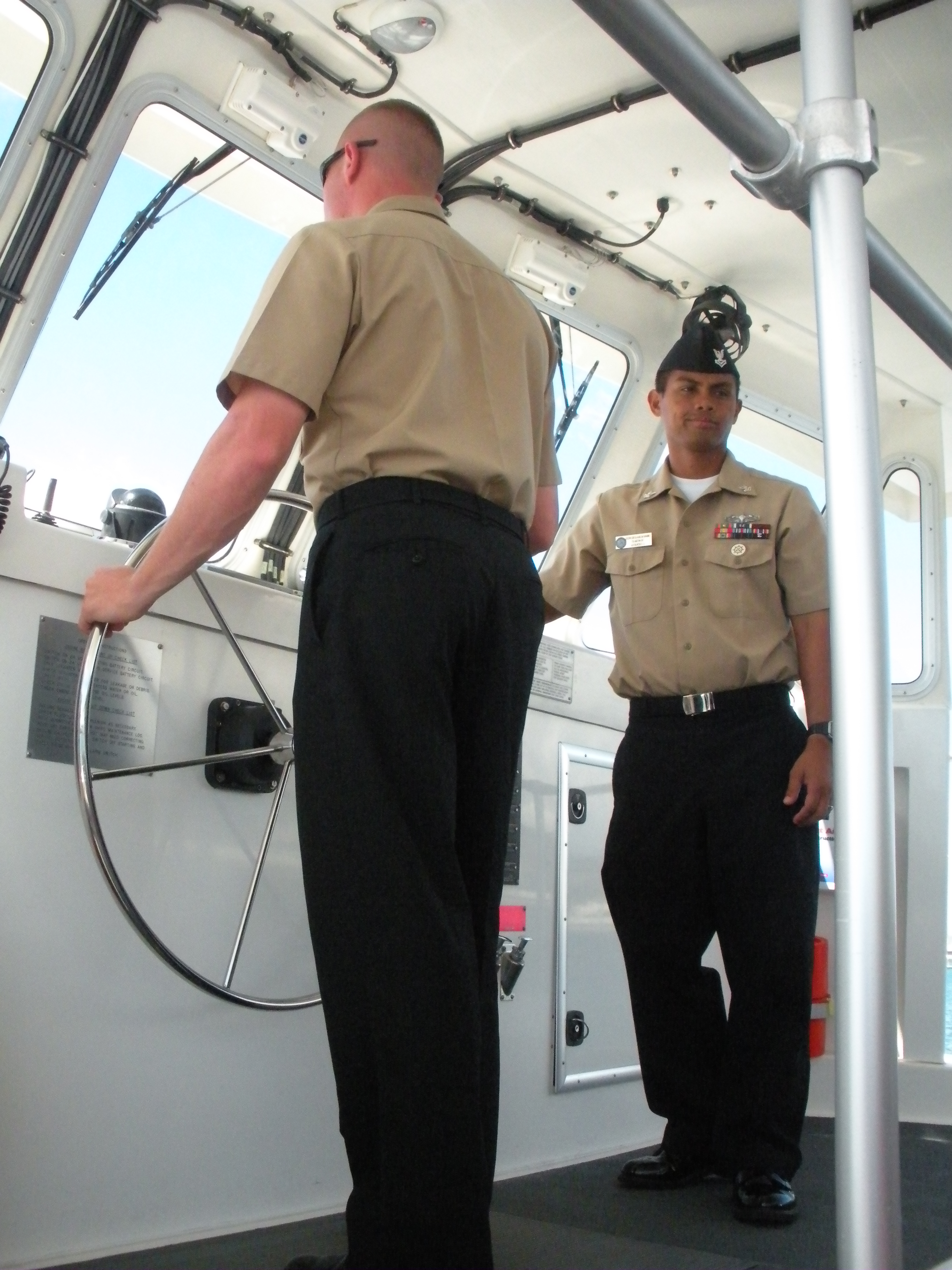
Heading out to the Memorial - military escort and pilot. (10/2012)

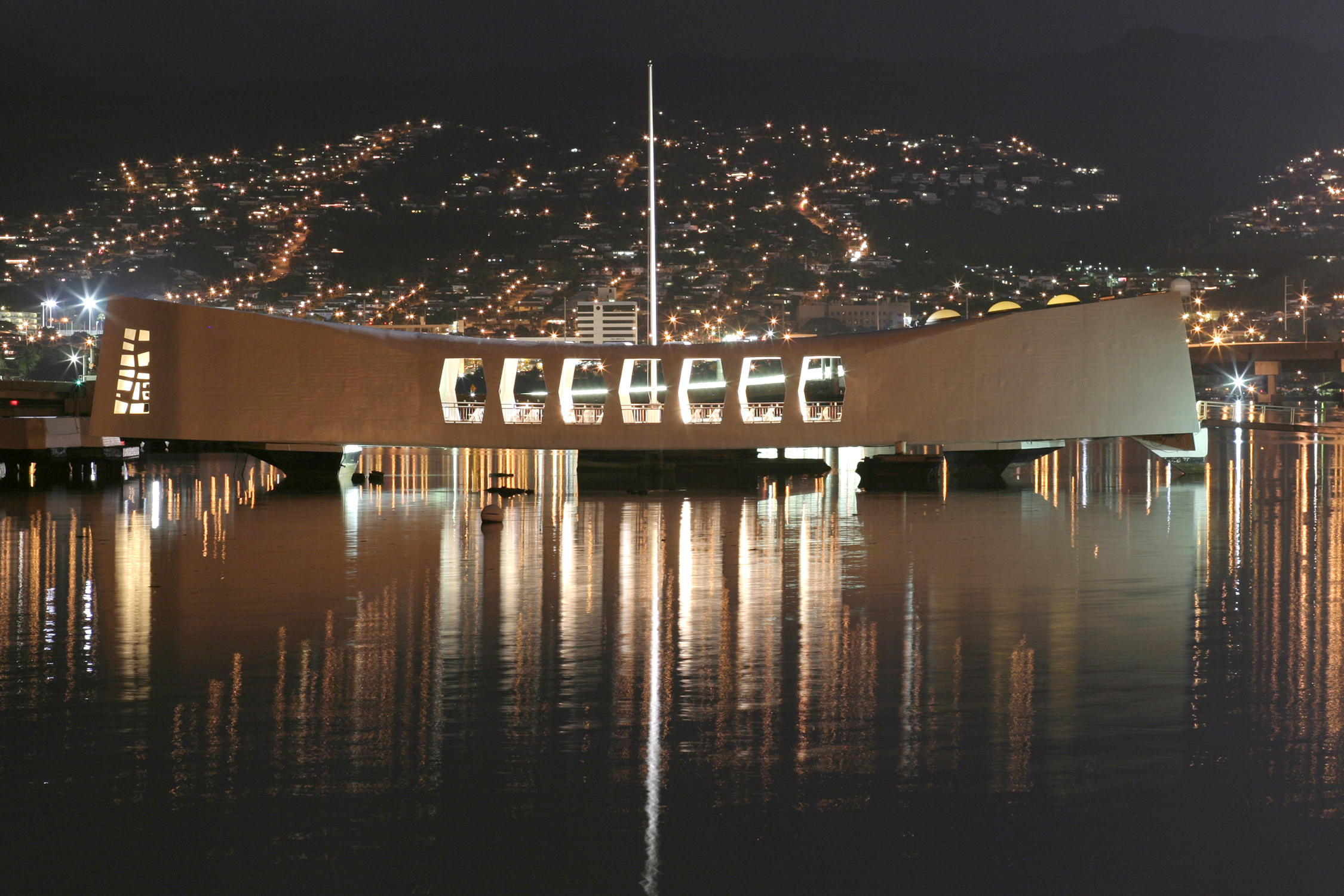
USS Arizona Memorial is bathed by the lights of ‘Aiea on the evening of the 62nd anniversary of the attack on Pearl Harbor, December 7, 2003.

== See also ==
- USS Arizona salvaged artifacts
- USS Utah (BB-31) wreck of ship lost at Pearl Harbor and memorial
- U.S. Navy memorials
- U.S. Navy museums (and battleship museums)
- University of Arizona – Student Union Memorial Center
- List of cemeteries in Hawaii
- List of national memorials of the United States
