= Alfred Preis =

Austrian-born American architect (1911–1994)

- Alfred Preis
- Born: February 2, 1911; Vienna, Austria-Hungary
- Died: March 29, 1994 (aged 83); Honolulu, Hawaii
- Education: Vienna Technical University
- Occupation: Architect
- Awards: National AIA award for Arizona Memorial and the First Methodist Church, AIA Chapter Awards for the Gustav Ecke Residence, James Harrison Residence, ILWU Addition; Special Citation for Contribution to the Environment
- Practice: Redlich und Berger in Austria, then Dahl and Conrad, Hart Wood, Associated Architects, and his own office in Honolulu
- Buildings: USS Arizona Memorial, the entrance of the Honolulu Zoo, the First United Methodist Church, ILWU headquarters (all in Honolulu)

Alfred Preis (February 2, 1911 – March 29, 1994) was an Austrian-born American architect best known for designing the USS Arizona Memorial in Pearl Harbor.

== Early years in Austria ==
Born and raised in Vienna, Austria, Preis spent his early architecture career in Vienna. He studied at the Vienna Technical University, earned his Architecture diploma in 1938, and worked as a site manager for Redlich and Berger and as a freelance designer for interiors, furniture and store fronts. Although of Jewish background, he converted to Roman Catholicism in 1936. Newlywed, he and his wife fled Austria in 1939 in the face of the German annexation of his homeland and emigrated to the U.S. with the help of the Catholic Refugee Association.

== In Honolulu ==
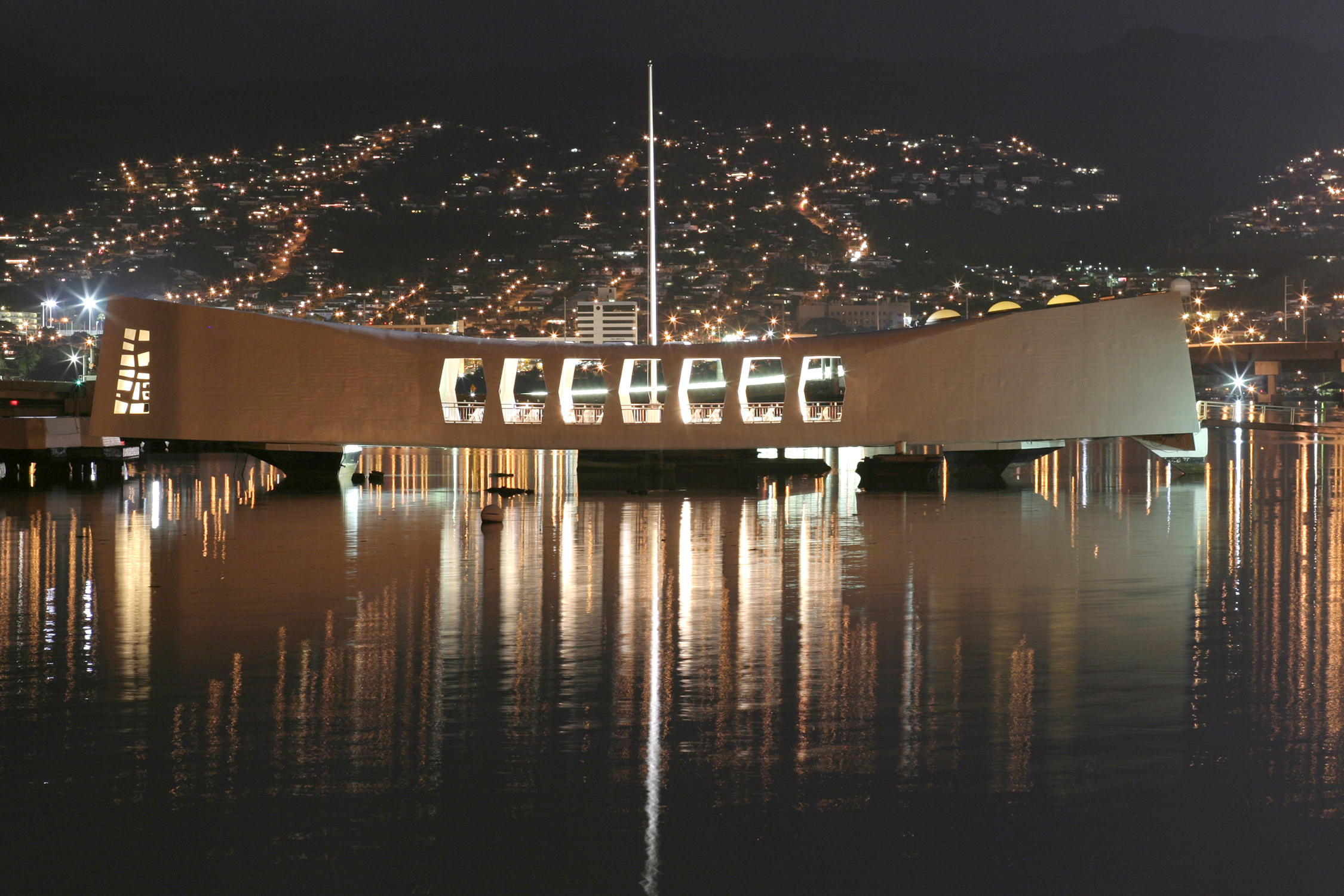
USS Arizona Memorial is bathed by the lights of ‘Aiea on the evening of the 62nd anniversary of the attack on Pearl Harbor, December 7, 2003.

=== Internment ===
He eventually settled in Honolulu, Hawaii, where he was detained for three months at the Sand Island Detainment Camp in Hawaii after the December 7, 1941, attack as part of the internment policy of Japanese and German Americans.

=== Career ===
After his release from internment, Preis worked at the Hawaii Territorial Department of Public Works and later opened his own office.

Preis designed several landmark buildings in Honolulu, including the entrance to the Honolulu Zoo, but is best known for the USS Arizona Memorial. His design for the memorial was selected from those of several other architects. The Navy stipulated that the memorial was supposed to resemble a bridge, handle 200 people and not touch Arizona herself. The original design included portholes where visitors could see the ship beneath the surface. The Navy vetoed this.

The memorial, which was dedicated by John F. Kennedy on May 30, 1962, was initially criticized for being a "squashed milk carton" because of its sagging center roof design. Preis responded:

Wherein the structure sags in the center but stands strong and vigorous at the ends, expresses initial defeat and ultimate victory....The overall effect is one of serenity. Overtones of sadness have been omitted to permit the individual to contemplate his own personal responses...his innermost feelings.

The memorial is Oahu's biggest tourist destination with 1.5 million visitors a year.

=== Later years ===
Preis went on to become a promoter for arts and culture education in Hawaii. He was the first executive director of the Hawaii State Foundation for Culture and the Arts, serving from 1966 to 1980. During this time he championed a successful effort that, in 1967, made Hawaii the first state to require that one percent of the construction budget for public projects be set aside for public art. Also under Preis' leadership, the HSFCA and the Department of Education established the Artists in the Schools program that provided opportunities for elementary and secondary students in Hawaii schools to work with local professional artists.

Preis' ashes were scattered from the memorial. The Hawaii Arts Alliance presents an award known as the Alfred Preis Honor to an individual who demonstrates a lifetime commitment to arts and arts education in Hawaii.
