= Conference report =

United States legislative term

In the United States Congress, a conference report refers to the final version of a bill that is negotiated between the House of Representatives and the Senate via a conference committee. This report is crucial in resolving differences between the two chambers' versions of a bill, ensuring that a unified and consistent piece of legislation can be presented for final approval. It is printed and submitted to each chamber for its consideration, such as approval or disapproval. It contains a statement of managers, a section-by-section explanation of the agreement.

== Historical Background ==
The practice of using conference reports dates back to the early years of the United States Congress. Conference committees were established as a means to reconcile differences between the House and Senate versions of legislation, a necessity for ensuring smooth legislative processes. Over time, the procedures and rules governing conference reports have evolved, reflecting changes in congressional operations and advancements in technology.

== Purpose and Significance ==
The primary purpose of a conference report is to resolve legislative disagreements between the House and Senate. This process is essential for creating coherent and effective laws. Conference reports facilitate compromise and collaboration, enabling legislators to address concerns and incorporate diverse perspectives. The final version of a bill included in a conference report often represents a balanced approach that can gain broader support.

== Publication Procedure ==
An amendment to Rule XXVIII of the Standing Rules of the United States Senate states:

9(a)(1) It shall not be in order to vote on the adoption of a report of a committee of conference unless such report has been available to Members and to the general public for at least 48 hours before such vote. If a point of order is sustained under this paragraph, then the conference report shall be set aside.

Normally, conference reports are printed and made available online in the Congressional Record the day after they have been filed. In those cases when the Government Publishing Office (GPO) is unable to print a conference report the next day, the GPO will scan the manuscript and post the searchable PDF of the manuscript on this web page. Otherwise, links to the conference reports as they appear in the Congressional Record will be posted on this web page.

== Examples of Notable Conference Reports ==
Notable conference reports have played critical roles in shaping significant legislation. For instance, the conference report for the Tax Cuts and Jobs Act of 2017 was a key document that reconciled differences between the House and Senate versions of the tax reform bill, leading to major changes in the U.S. tax code. Another example is the conference report for the Affordable Care Act, which helped finalize the landmark healthcare reform legislation.

== Current Practices and Digital Access ==
In recent years, the process of handling conference reports has become more transparent and accessible, largely due to digital advancements. The Government Publishing Office (GPO) now ensures that conference reports are promptly made available online, typically in the Congressional Record the day after filing. If immediate printing is not possible, the GPO scans the manuscript and posts a searchable PDF online. This practice enhances public access and allows for greater scrutiny and understanding of legislative processes.
