= Environmental history of the United States =

The environmental history of the United States covers the history of the environment over the centuries to the late 20th century, plus the political and expert debates on conservation and environmental issues. The term "conservation" appeared in 1908 and was gradually replaced by "environmentalism" in the 1970s as the focus shifted from managing and protecting natural resources to a broader concern for the environment as a whole and the negative impact of poor air or water on humans. The late twentieth century saw a shift towards “environmental justice,” highlighting the way in which environmental benefits and burdens are unevenly distributed across lines of race, class, and ethnicity.

For recent history see Environmental policy of the United States.

Trends in carbon dioxide emission in the United States, 1800 to 2020.

== Environmental trends ==
=== The Pre-Columbian Environment ===
According to Erin Stewart Mauldin, the geological history of the United States predates human settlement by millions of years. The landscape of the North American continent's landscape was shaped by plate tectonics, volcanic activity, and glaciation. The Appalachian Mountains resulted from plate collisions, the Rocky Mountains from the subduction of the Pacific Ocean floor, and the Pacific Northwest and New England from the accretion of microcontinents. Glaciation formed the Great Lakes and influenced soil composition across the country, with volcanic activity contributing to regions like the Columbia Plateau. Paleoindians from Siberia were the continent's first human inhabitants starting 30,000 BCE. They coexisted with megafauna like mammoths.

The reasons for these species' extinction, possibly due to climate change or human hunting, remain debated. The absence of large domesticable animals in North America affected the development of societies, limiting hunting and herding and later giving European colonizers a biological edge. Native Americans developed diverse subsistence strategies, including agriculture, hunting, and fishing, with varying practices across regions. They also impacted the landscape through land clearing and hunting practices, leading to environmental changes. The pre-Columbian landscape encountered by Europeans was significantly shaped by human activity, challenging the idea of an untouched wilderness.

=== Colonization and Settlement ===
Scholar Dina Gilio-Whitaker explains that as the Spanish arrived in North America in the 1500s, and the English established the first permanent colony of Jamestown in 1607, they brought ideas of land ownership that conflicted with the Indigenous attitude of land as a commune. The settler colonial drive to own the land required the forced removal of Indigenous people. European settlers destroyed Indigenous agricultural resources in a successful attempt to starve people off their ancestral land. The disruption and seizure of Indigenous trade routes made some native groups vulnerable and dependent on the settlers themselves. These actions altered the environment away from that which was stewarded by native peoples, instead shifting it towards colonial ideas of ownership.

According to historian David Silkenat, indigenous practices and stewardship such as controlled burns, subsistence hunting and gathering, and large farms growing corn, beans, squash, and more, were met with settler monoculture plantations dependent on enslaved people. Settler agriculture in the South varied, with a mixture of smaller farms and large extractive plantations which took a toll on the soils.

However, settlers did not easily adapt to their new environment, finding that European farming practices did not translate to their new land according to historian Kenneth MacMillan. While the English expected the climate of the Carolinas and Virginia to be like that of Spain, they were met with both hotter and colder conditions than expected. They mistakenly believed there to be similar commodities to that of the East and West Indies such as gold. The Jamestown colony, located in what is now Virginia, facing the inconsistent weather of the South, struggled to establish reliable food sources, often having to trade with native people for corn and other resources, especially through the cold winters. However, by 1617, English tobacco was established as a cash crop, and grown on plantations, using African slave labor.

=== New England to 1815 ===
Before 1815 the New England farmers were largely self-sufficient. The forest provided wood to build homes and barns, and fueled the stove all winter long. Timber was sold for ship construction and naval stores were sold for export to England. The remaining forest was the habitat for deer and other game that were easily hunted with muskets or traps. Once cleared the land provided pasture for the sheep (raised for the wool), the hogs, and the family cow, as well as space for the vegetable garden. The significance of the forest ranged from a threat to settlers to being a place of Puritan religious significance, as well as a source of beauty and pride. As population grew the forest transitioned from a perceived abundance to a dwindling asset. After 1815, when export markets reopened after the Napoleonic Wars and the War of 1812, farmers in the region increasingly focused more on profitable commercial crops, especially sheep, cattle, hay, lumber, wheat. As the nearby cities grew they sold more milk and cheese, eggs, apples, cranberries and maple syrup.

=== Destruction of a fourth of the forests, 1780s to 1860s ===
According to geographer Michael Williams, by 1860, about 153 million acres of forest had been cleared for farms, and another 11 million acres cut down by industrial logging, mining, railroad construction, and urban expansion. A fourth of the original forest cover in the eastern states was gone. At the same time there was a major change in how Americans viewed forests. They were recognized as the foundation of industrialization, agricultural expansion, and material progress. Lumber was the nation's largest industry in 1850, and second in 1860 behind textiles. As Frederick Starr emphasized in 1865, forests were integral to the four key necessities for prosperity: "cheap bread, cheap houses, cheap fuel, and cheap transportation for passengers and freights." Lumbering was a very dangerous trade, with crippling accidents and death a common hazard. But it paid well because the lumber was essential for construction and wood was the main fuel for homes, business, steamboats and railroads. Intellectuals began examining the complex relationships between forests and soil, climate, farming, railroading and the economy. They pondered the overall ecological balance. Was the nation's energy at risk as settlement expanded westward into the trans-Mississippi prairies where wood was scarce.

Given the economic and cultural importance of the forests, some worried commentators, especially George Perkins Marsh and Increase Lapham. began questioning the widespread destruction. They saw the forests and backwoods pioneers as symbols of America, and their disappearance was concerning. Romantic writers such as Henry David Thoreau and Ralph Waldo Emerson helped Americans appreciate the aesthetic and recreational value of forests, beyond just their economic importance. The early conservation movement had its roots in these concerns.

=== Industrial Revolution, 1810s–1890s ===
In the late 18th and early 19th centuries, wastes from mining operations began to enter rivers and streams, and iron bloomeries and furnaces used water for cooling. In the early 19th century, the development of steam engines led to their use in the mining and manufacturing sectors (such as textiles). The expanded use of steam engines generated larger volumes of heated water (thermal pollution). The productivity gains, along with the introduction of railroads in the 1830s and 1840s—which increased the overall demand for coal and minerals—led to additional generation of wastes.

The Second Industrial Revolution led to development of manufacturing processes that generated new types of wastes, including air, water and land pollution (solid and hazardous waste). These new industrial sectors included:

- iron and steel
- oil and gas extraction
- petroleum refineries
- manufacturing (smelting) of non-ferrous metals
- rubber manufacturing
- fertilizers and chemicals
- paper products manufacturing.

=== Hazards of textile mills ===
Cash wages brought rural workers into the new textile mills first in New England after 1810 and then in the South after 1870. The mills were powered by waterwheels on local rivers and caused little harm to the external environment. The hazards came indoors as workers faced air and noise pollution. The men, women and children worked in family teams 10 hours a day in a tightly enclosed environment filled with dust and fiber. The machinery occasionally caused accidents but the polluted environment was much more serious. Having large numbers of people laboring in close quarters day after day was the ideal settings for the rapid spread of diseases including the common cold, bronchitis, pneumonia and tuberculosis. The also suffered hearing loss and fatigue. Byssinosis, also known as "brown lung disease" or "Monday fever," was particularly prevalent among cotton textile workers, with symptoms including chest tightness and shortness of breath.. There were sharp disagreements among workers, employers, and medical professionals regarding the impact of factory environments on health. The mills seldom employed medical care on site but they did support community hospitals.

=== Hazards of underground mines ===
Underground mining was a very hazardous occupation. However the coal, iron, lead and copper was essential for industrialization. Enslaved people worked the mines pre-civil war. Later, labor demand drew many European immigrants, black workers under Jim Crow, and local Appalachian families.

According to economic historian Price V. Fishback, in addition to the hazards of mine collapses, miners and the area where mines, such as coal, were located faced well and water supply contamination. From various mining processes, arsenic, barium, lead, manganese, iron, and sulfate, were found in well and water supplies. Open mine fields, blasting, and transportation also created particulate matter and fumes containing sulfur dioxide, nitrous oxide, benzene, carbon monoxide, polycyclic aromatic hydrocarbons, arsenic, mercury, and other heavy metals. In turn, miners and those who lived near the mines face black lung, cardiovascular diseases, other lung diseases, and potentially cancer.

Paul Rakes examines coal mine fatalities in West Virginia in the first half of the 20th century. Besides the well-publicized mine disasters that killed a number of miners at a time, there were many smaller episodes in which one or two miners lost their lives. Mine accidents were considered inevitable, and mine safety did not appreciably improve the situation because of lax enforcement. West Virginia's mines were considered so unsafe that immigration officials would not recommend them as a source of employment for immigrants, but they came anyway for the high pay. When the United States Bureau of Mines was given more authority to regulate mine safety in the 1960s, safety awareness improved, and West Virginia coal mines became less dangerous.

The transition after 1920 from coal to hydro and oil and later to nuclear, gas and solar power dramatically lowered the hazards to energy workers. Likewise the transition from underground to surface mining.

=== Western frontier ===
The British government attempt to restrict westward expansion with the ineffective Proclamation Line of 1763 was cancelled by the new United States government. The first major movement west of the Appalachian Mountains began in Pennsylvania, Virginia and North Carolina as soon as the Revolutionary War was effectively won in 1781. Pioneers housed themselves in a rough lean-to or at most a one-room log cabin. The main food supply at first came from hunting deer, turkeys, and other abundant small game.

Clad in typical frontier garb, leather breeches, moccasins, fur cap, and hunting shirt, and girded by a belt from which hung a hunting knife and a shot pouch – all homemade – the pioneer presented a unique appearance. In a short time he opened in the woods a patch, or clearing, on which he grew corn, wheat, flax, tobacco and other products, even fruit. In a few years the pioneer added hogs, sheep and cattle, and perhaps acquired a horse. Homespun clothing replaced the animal skins. The more restless pioneers grew dissatisfied with over civilized life, and uprooted themselves again to move 50 or hundred miles (80 or 160 km) further west.

In 1788, American pioneers to the Northwest Territory established Marietta, Ohio as the first permanent American settlement in the Northwest Territory.

The Louisiana Purchase of 1803 doubled the size of the nation. It contained a few small European settlements and large numbers of Native Americans. The federal government had charge of Indian affairs, and one by one purchased Indian lands. Individuals who were willing to assimilate into American society were allowed to remain. Tribes that wanted to keep their self-government kept a small part of their land as an Indian reservation and sold the rest to the federal government for an annual subsidy from the Bureau of Indian Affairs. Those tribes east of the Mississippi were usually relocated further west, primarily to Indian Territory (now the state of Oklahoma). See Indian removal.

As settlers spread Westward, their desire to commodify the land conflicted with the existence of Native peoples in those regions. In turn, military campaigns were utilized for forced removal. Some examples of this were long marches off land to reservations or prison camps at gunpoint such as the Long Walk of the Diné in 1864 and the Trail of Tears for the Cherokee, Creek, Chickasaw, Seminole, and Choctaw from 1838 to 1839. Removals led to the deaths of over 25 percent of those forced to march and the loss of life-sustaining livestock and crops. For some people, their new lands resembled those they left behind and were able to adapt to new environments while altering their way of lives to fit the infrastructure of American expansion that spread into the West and onto their land such as railroads. However, during the Diné's forced walk to the first reservation in the West, many died before and after arriving. The land provided was overpopulated with brackish water and an inadequate amount of firewood. Despite attempts to continue farming practices, both the irrigation system and crops failed. See Indian removal.

By 1813, the western frontier had reached the Mississippi River. St. Louis, Missouri was the largest town on the frontier, the gateway for travel westward, and a principal trading center for Mississippi River traffic and inland commerce. There was wide agreement on the need to settle the new territories quickly, but the debate polarized over the price the government should charge. The conservatives and Whigs, typified by president John Quincy Adams, wanted a moderated pace that charged the newcomers enough to pay the costs of the federal government. The Democrats, however, tolerated a wild scramble for land at very low prices. The final resolution came in the Homestead Law of 1862, with a moderated pace that gave settlers 160 acres free after they worked on it for five years.

From the 1770s to the 1830s, pioneers moved into the new lands that stretched from Kentucky to Alabama to Texas. Most had operated farmers back east and now relocated in family groups. Historian Louis M. Hacker shows how wasteful the first generation of pioneers was; they were too ignorant to cultivate the land properly and when the natural fertility of virgin land was used up, they sold out and moved west to try again. Hacker describes that in Kentucky about 1812:

Farms were for sale with from ten to fifty acres cleared, possessing log houses, peach and sometimes apple orchards, inclosed in fences, and having plenty of standing timber for fuel. The land was sown in wheat and corn, which were the staples, while hemp [for making rope] was being cultivated in increasing quantities in the fertile river bottoms. ... Yet, on the whole, it was an agricultural society without skill or resources. It committed all those sins which characterize a wasteful and ignorant husbandry. Grass seed was not sown for hay and as a result, the farm animals had to forage for themselves in the forests; the fields were not permitted to lie in pasturage; a single crop was planted in the soil until the land was exhausted; the manure was not returned to the fields; only a small part of the farm was brought under cultivation, the rest being permitted to stand in timber. Instruments of cultivation were rude and clumsy and only too few, many of them being made on the farm. It is plain why the American frontier settler was on the move continually. It was, not his fear of a too close contact with the comforts and restraints of a civilized society that stirred him into a ceaseless activity, nor merely the chance of selling out at a profit to the coming wave of settlers; it was his wasting land that drove him on. Hunger was the goad. The pioneer farmer's ignorance, his inadequate facilities for cultivation, his limited means, of transport necessitated his frequent changes of scene. He could succeed only with virgin soil.

Hacker adds that the second wave of settlers reclaimed the land, repaired the damage, and practiced a more sustainable agriculture.

=== Slavery ===
As European colonists settled in what would become the United States, they established large extractive plantations for crops such as tobacco, rice, and cotton, relying on the Atlantic slave trade for plantation and domestic labor from 1619 to 1865. As landowners sought to maximize profits through slave labor and fertility from the soil, they created a system that degraded both enslaved people and the Southern landscape. Historian David Silkenat notes that, “profitability of slave labor prompted plantation owners to abuse the land, favoring short-term financial gains over long-term sustainability."

Upon the establishment of slave labor on plantations, forests were cleared, swamps were drained, and fragile ecosystems were destroyed. These practices left eroded hillsides, rivers clogged with sterile soil, and lead to the extinction of native species. Like the people they enslaved for labor, plantation owners viewed the land as disposable, relocating to more fertile prospects once the nutrients had been leeched from the soil and forests had been cut down. As Silkenat claims, “more than a century and a half after the legal end of slavery in the United States, its scars remain on the landscape."

However, as much as slavery reshaped the Southern landscape, the environment shaped American slavery. According to Silkenat, the enslaved people who worked the land gained extensive knowledge of the surrounding environment. At night, enslaved people would secretly utilize the woods to trap food, visit relatives at neighbouring plantations, and use their knowledge of the environment to escape to freedom. While some escaped north, others established communities deep in alligator-infested swamps where plantation owners would not venture. African Americans drew upon their environmental knowledge to liberate themselves, later leading to the civil war.

=== Civil War ===
In the Civil War (1861–1865) more powerful long-range rifles and artillery caused high casualty rates of wounding and death. The Union forces had much better medical and hospital facilities, while the supply system failed so often in the Confederacy that for months at a time soldiers marched and fought barefoot, with little medicine available to their overworked doctors. The Union systematically devastated the railway system in the South and ruined many cotton plantations. Combat operations killed thousands of horses and mules used to pull supplies, artillery and munitions. The South was overwhelmingly rural, with a priority on growing and exporting cotton to textile factories. Most of the food was imported from the North. The Union blockade shut down most of the cotton exports and nearly all of its food imports. The Union cut off many of its internal rail and river travel routes. The main Southern meat supply was pork, but the output was sharply reduced by disease and shortages of feed. Hunger and bad nutrition weakened the Confederacy and led to desertions as Confederate soldiers realized their families were at risk of starvation.

The war was largely fought in hot, wet regions hosting numerous pandemic diseases. As a result, sickness rates were high on both sides. For both armies disease caused about twice as many deaths as did combat. The main causes of fatality were diarrhea and dysentery, followed by typhoid fever, pneumonia, malaria and smallpox.

Malaria was widespread across the South. The Union army suffered over 1 million cases of malaria, resulting in about 10,000 deaths. It accounted for about 1 in 6 of the 6.5 million episodes of illnesses . More Southerners had immunity but they had many cases and far worse medical treatment. Quinine was the only effective remedy—Union doctors had plenty but the blockade cut off supplies to the South. Ticks, lice and fleas caused much illness in both armies especially Typhus and Relapsing fever.

Of the 3 million horses and mules in military service during the war, about half died. The main causes were battle injuries, overwork, diseases like glanders and lack of proper food and care. In the South the Union army shot horses it did not need to keep them out of Confederate hands.

=== Great Plains 1800s ===
The population of the Great Plains states, including Minnesota, Dakota, Nebraska, and Kansas, grew from 1.0 million in 1870 to 2.4 million in 1880. The number of farms in the region tripled, increasing from 99,000 in 1870 to 302,000 in 1880. The improved acreage (land under cultivation) quintupled, rising from 5.0 million acres to 24.6 million acres during the same period. the new settlers mostly purchased land on generous terms from transcontinental railroads that were given land grants by Washington. They focused on wheat and cattle. This rapid population influx and agricultural expansion was a hallmark of the settlement and development of the Great Plains in the late 19th century, as the region attracted waves of new settlers from Germany, Scandinavia, and Russia, as well as farmers who sold land in older states to move to larger farms.

As settlers expanded into the Great Plains in the 19th century, they displaced Native American populations to transform the landscape for European settlement and resource extraction. As a part of strategized displacement, the U.S. Army was deployed for the mass slaughter of bison herds, animals essential to Indigenous ways of life in the plains. Army official, Lieutenant Colonel Dodge, told soldiers, “Kill every buffalo you can! Every buffalo dead is an Indian gone.”

As historian Rosalyn R. LaPier explains, Native Americans, such as the Lakota Sioux and the Comanche, had hunted bison for centuries, each with their own deep individual connection to the animal. The bison provided them with meat for food, hides for shelter and clothing, and bones for tools, an essential part of Indigenous ways of life on the plains. Indigenous people hunted in sustainable ways, not affecting the population. Eradication of the bison caused starvation and stripped Indigenous people of land, nationhood, and culture. This new vulnerability allowed settlers to force surviving Native Nations onto reservations. Close to the turn of the century, there were between 30 and 60 million bison in the Great Plains. By 1892, the number had dropped to 456. In addition to the subjugation and killing of Native Americans, this drop in population also effected the ecology of the plains. Bison were a keystone species and without them the entire ecosystem changed. Dead bison meant the end of grazing, wallowing and migrating practices that made the land accommodating of other species. The insects that had lived in bison dung were the food for birds, turtles, and bats. Bison would create impressions in the dirt where they rolled, which would later fill with rain, providing homes for tadpoles and frogs. When the bison no longer exist, these species disappear.

According to scholar Danielle Taschereau Mamers, the near extinction of the bison marked not just an ecological catastrophe, but a deliberate campaign of cultural and economic warfare against Indigenous peoples of the Great Plains.

=== Metropolitan industry 1870-1920 ===
In 1870 to 1920, the center of industrialization expanded from New England and the Mid-Atlantic regions into the Midwest to Chicago and St Louis. According to Martin V. Melosi this became the industrial base of the world's leading industrial power. Environmental degradation, ignored at first, became an increasing concern regarding sewage, garbage, drinking water, and clean air and adequate medical care.. Pollution was caused by primarily by coal. It was the primary energy source to power factories and heat offices and apartments. Its use led to a sharp increase in carbon emissions and air pollution. The concentration of industries such as steel improved efficiency but increased resource waste and pollution of air and water as urban rivers became dumping grounds for industrial waste. Residential overcrowding into tenements led to poor sanitation and more sickness.

== History of energy ==
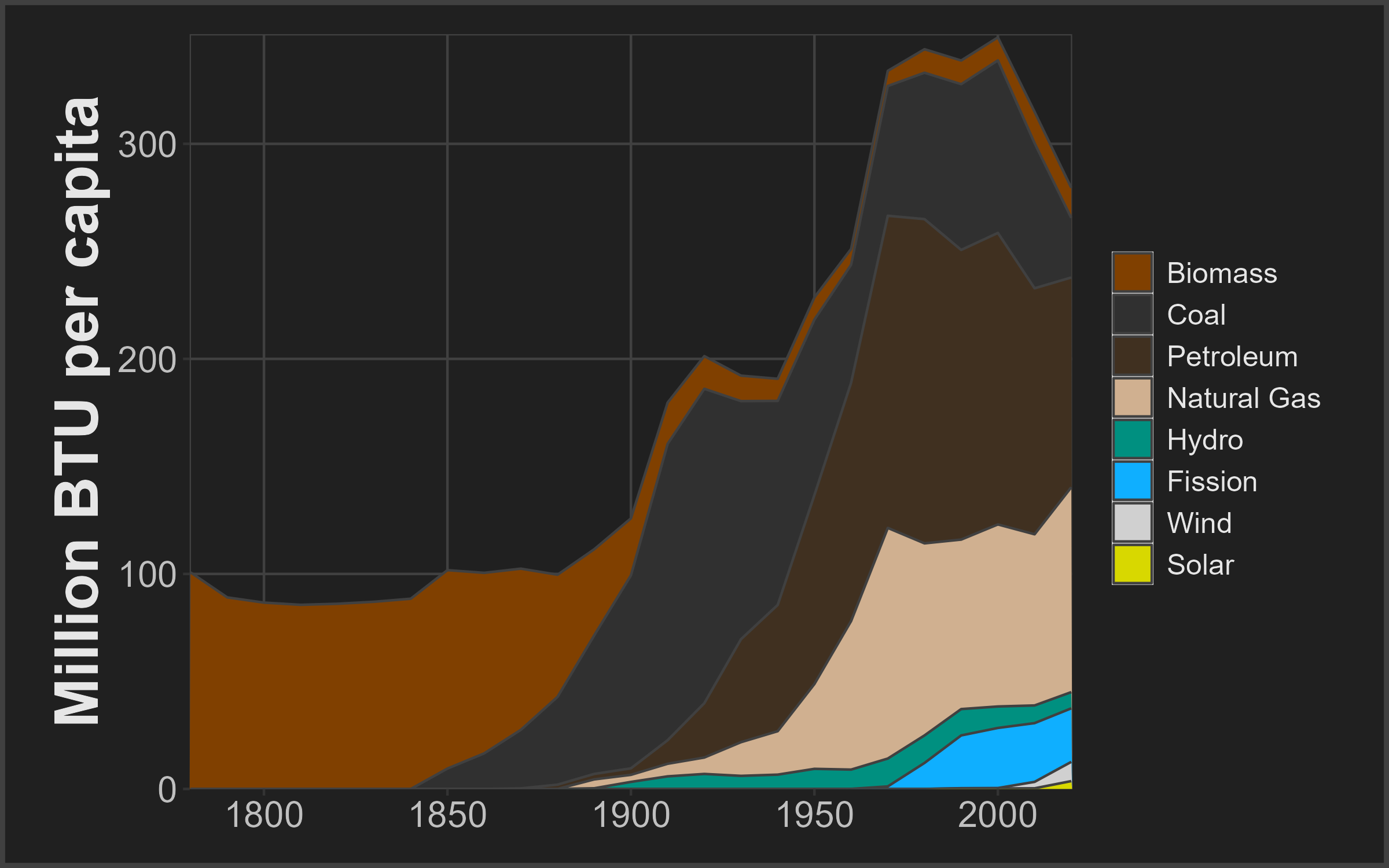
Per capita energy use by source

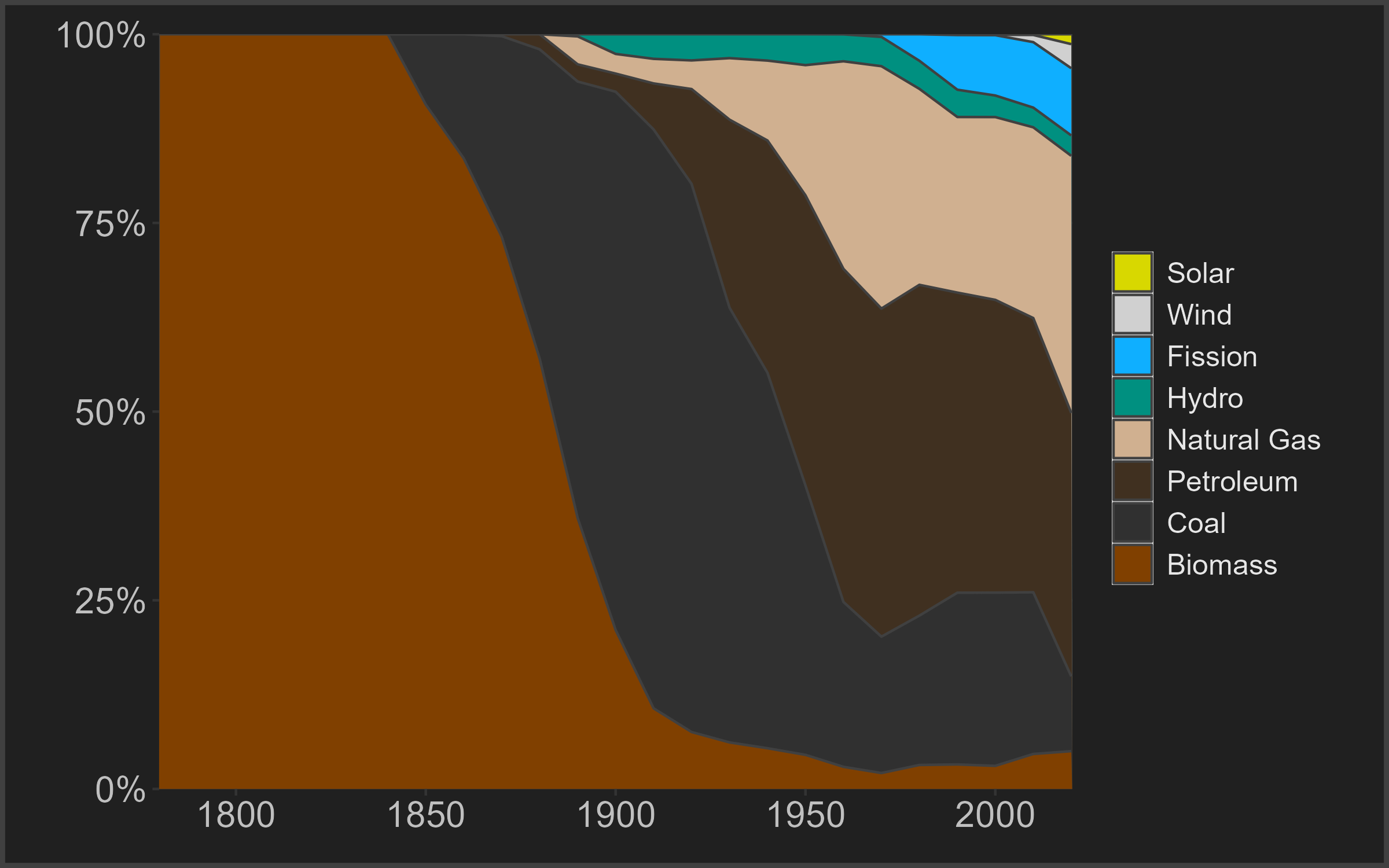
The percentage of energy use by source

Energy history is the record over four centuries of the transitions from wood and water power, to coal, to oil and natural gas, and most recently renewable energy. Robert Suits, Nathan Matteson, and Elisabeth Moyer, "Energy Transitions in U.S. History, 1800–2019" (Center for Robust Decision-making on Climate and Energy Policy, U of Chicago, 2020) online

=== Wood and Water Power in Colonial and Early National eras (1600s–mid-1800s) ===
Wood was the main fuel for heating, cooking, and basic industry due to abundant forests up and down the Thirteen Colonies. Water wheels in local streams powered early mills in New England and small-scale manufacturing, becoming critical during the early phases of industrialization, 1810s-1840s. By the late-1800s, wood ("biomass" in the graphs) began to decline as the nation's energy demands soared and forests near growing cities were depleted.

=== The Rise of Coal: Mid-1800s to Early 1900s ===
After 1850 the nation's accelerating industrial growth led to a surge in coal use, spurred by railroads, steam engines, and later, electric power generation. By the late 19th century, coal overtook wood as the dominant energy source. Coal was powering factories, heating homes and shops, and was essential for railroads and steel mills. Bituminous coal. or soft coal dominated. Coal's preeminence continued into the early 20th century, accounting for up to three-quarters of the national energy supply by World War I. A serious challenge was the enormous pollution caused by soft coal in the overcrowded cities. There was a growing demand for Smoke abatement.

=== Oil and Natural Gas ===
New technology and new policies enabled oil and natural gas to move from rarity in 1860 to the dominant fuels by 1920. Factories switched to the internal combustion engine for power. States actively supported the oil industry. New giant corporations, especially Rockefeller's Standard Oil Company built a vast network of pipelines which moved energy more cheaply than railroads. Oil and natural gas replaced coal, especially after World War I and into the mid-20th century. One result was smoke abatement, as heavy smoke and smog declined sharply after 1945.

=== Stalled movement to nuclear power ===
The federal government after 1945 promoted nuclear technology, both for military and peaceful civilian purposes, and financed the rapid increase in nuclear power plants in the 1960s-1970s. But then nuclear power stalled in the face of radiation dangers and successful anti-nuclear campaigns. A decisive event was the accidental release of radiation at Three Mile Island in Pennsylvania in 1979.

Nuclear power plants and related facilities in the United States have often been disproportionately proposed and located in or near communities of color and low-income areas. Native American land or reservations is often affected by these developments. Community groups such as the National Environmental Coalition of Native Americans (NECONA), founded by Grace Thorpe in 1993, served to stand against nuclear contamination of lands such as Monitored Retrievable Storage (MRS) programs which proposed temporary above-ground storage for spent nuclear fuel and high-level radioactive waste. NECONA urged tribes to institute nuclear-free zones on their lands, successfully facilitating the agreement of 75 tribes by 1997.

Before NECONA's advocacy and success, nuclear facilities posed significant health risks to Native communities. The Prairie Island Nuclear Power Plant, built by Westinghouse for the utility Northern States Power on a sandbar in the middle of the Mississippi River in 1973 and 1974, was located beside the homes, businesses, and childcare center of the Mdewakanton Dakota Prairie Island homeland. While the plant produced an estimated 15 percent of Minnesota's power, none benefitted the Mdewakanton Dakota people. In turn, it actively harmed the environment and population. The plant did not inform the Prairie Island residents about several safety breaches such as a 30-minute radioactive leak in 1979 where staff were rushed offsite, but the Dakota people were not informed until they discovered the hazard for themselves on the radio. In 1994, the Minnesota Department of Health found that the plant had exposed Prairie Island residents to six times greater risk of cancer. These environmental impacts were due to the island's limited space for waste. In 1986, the waste was put into an on-site nuclear dump in reinforced-steel cans outside the plant. By 1988, the plant requested permission from the government to store more fuel in dry cask storage, a method which most believed would significantly increase the risk to the tribe. In turn, the tribe brought a six year long legal battle in opposition to the request. Although in 1994 Minnesota legislature allowed dry cask storage three blocks from the tribe's childcare center on an interim basis, it was on the terms that a permanent storage facility would be opened by 2004, or the plant would be shut down. It was the first instance where a state legislature required a reactor to shut down if it lacked an approved waste disposal site.

Another feature of nuclear power is the need for uranium mining. According to environmental historian Traci Brynne Voyles, the 1941 search for uranium to support the Manhattan Project resulted in the discovery and mining of deposits on and near Navajo (Diné) land. This discovery brought in a rush of mining companies, however by 1981 the metal was no longer profitable. This uranium boom left over 2,000 now-abandoned uranium mines, mills, and tailings piles in its wake. These sites, once manned by 3,000 Navajo miners, remain open, poorly covered, or insufficiently marked. The land around them is contaminated by the dangerous nature of uranium: radioactive tailings piles that leach radon gas into the air and water while scattering radioactive debris throughout the ecosystem. The radioactive contaminants are joined by other toxic contaminants such as arsenic, vanadium, and manganese.

=== Renewable energy ===
==== Renewable energy usage ====
Renewable energy sources in 2022. Renewables were 8.4% of total energy, or 8.3 quads.
1. Biomass (61.1%)
2. Wind (17.8%)
3. Hydro (10.5%)
4. Solar (9.20%)
5. Geothermal (1.40%)

Renewable energy accounted for 8.4% of total primary energy production and 21% of total utility-scale electricity generation in the United States in 2022.

Since 2019, wind power has been the largest producer of renewable electricity in the country. Wind power generated 434 terawatt-hours of electricity in 2022, which accounted for 10% of the nation's electricity and 48% of renewable generation.

Hydroelectric power is the second-largest producer of renewable electricity in the country, generating around 6.2% of the nation's electricity in 2022 as well as 29% of renewable generation. The United States is the fourth largest producer of hydroelectricity in the world after China, Canada and Brazil.

Solar power provides a growing share of electricity in the country, with over 111.6 GW of installed capacity generating about 3.4% of the country's total electricity supply in 2022, up from 2.8% the previous year.

==== Renewable energy policy ====
President Barack Obama (2009–2017) introduced the goal of using renewable energy to forestall the threat of global warming. The American Recovery and Reinvestment Act of 2009 invested heavily in clean energy and energy efficiency. His Clean Power Plan set the first-ever limits on carbon pollution from power plants. These efforts aimed to reduce greenhouse gas emissions, increase renewable energy generation, and foster a cleaner energy sector. The Presidency of Joseph Biden continued and enlarged on Obama's energy initiatives.

In the two Trump administrations, especially Second presidency of Donald Trump that policy was reversed. Denouncing wind and solar as "A Blight On Our Country," Trump rolled back support and subsidies. Instead he prioritized what he calls "reliable, dispatchable" energy sources, especially oil and gas.

==== Renewable energy risks ====
While renewable energy is praised for providing a solution to climate change, the methods of creating infrastructure for such technologies also pose environmental threats. Minerals such as cobalt, lithium, manganese, and nickel are essential for lithium-ion batteries, which are used in renewable energies like wind and solar to store energy. Mining of these critical minerals present occupational and environmental threats. For miners and those who live near mines, cobalt inhalation can cause respiratory toxicity such as hard metal lung disease. Systemic cobalt toxicity can cause cardiomyopathy, thyroid dysfunction, neurologic dysfunction, and aseptic lymphocyte-dominated vasculitis-associated lesions. Manganese has been extensively linked to neurotoxicity, neurologic and psychiatric manifestations such as Parkinsonism, motor deficits, cognitive impairment, and psychosis through both occupational and environmental exposure. The known genotoxin and carcinogen, nickel, is inhaled, ingested, and absorbed through skin. Lithium exposure is known to be nephrotoxic, thyrotoxic, and causes birth defects. As mining of these minerals expands, high levels of lifetime cancer risks have been found in samples from environments surrounding mines, with an increased risk for children compared to adults. Risks for those who live near mines largely comes from contamination of soil, water, plants, and animals. These contaminations have been found to pose a significant risk to environmental and human health.

These broader risks disproportionally burden communities already facing structural marginalization, particularly Indigenous nations whose lands, water, and cultural sites are often the locations of mining endeavors. In the case of the Hualapai tribe in Arizona, drilling of exploration holes in the 2024 search for lithium coincided with declining sacred spring water levels. Members of the Hualapai claim mining lithium and other minerals on or near native land brings the construction of roads, ports, and other infrastructure that brings pollution, loss of biodiversity, destruction of cultural sites, and increased violence against Indigenous women. The Hualapai share the same concerns as tribes in Nevada whose sacred land, Thacker Pass, is mined for its large lithium deposit. Since Thacker pass’ initial approval in 2021, both Indigenous and non-Indigenous people local to the area have forewarned about the environmental impacts. The company behind the mining project, Lithium Americas, plan to pump 1.7 million gallons of water from the aquifer each year, which ranchers claim will make their land unhospitable by draining the local aquifer.

Lithium Americas also plan to turn 6,000 acres of Thacker Pass into an industrial zone, destroying Native cultural sites. The industrial zone would consist of 1,000 acres for the pit, 1,000 acres for a tailings facility of hazardous material, and finally backfill, roads, worker facilities, septic systems, fencing, and an onsite sulfuric acid plant. These processes all increase concerns for air pollution and metal contamination of groundwater for those who live nearby. Both the Hualapai land and Thacker Pass are examples of groups and lands in the United States put at risk by the accelerated shift towards renewable resources and need for critical minerals.

== Public lands controlled by federal government ==
Red = Indian reservations. Map of US federal lands in late 20th century.

Among the first pieces of legislation passed following independence was the Land Ordinance of 1785, which provided for the surveying and sale of lands in the area created by state cessions of western land to the national government. Later, the Northwest Ordinance provided for the political organization of the Northwest Territories (now the states of Michigan, Wisconsin, Ohio, Illinois, and Indiana.

To encourage settlement of western lands, Congress passed the first of several Homestead Acts in 1862, granting parcels in 40-acre (160,000 m^{2}) increments to homesteaders who would maintain a living on the land for five years, and then they would own it. Congress also made huge land grants to various railroads working to complete a transcontinental rail system. The railroad grants included mineral and timber-rich lands so that the railroads could get financing to build. Again, the plan was that the railroads would sell off the land to get money, and the new transportation network would not use taxpayer money.

It turned out that much western land was not suited for homesteading because of mountainous terrain, poor soils, lack of available water, and other problems. By the early 20th century, the federal government held significant portions of most western states that had simply not been claimed for any use. Conservationists prevailed upon President Theodore Roosevelt to set aside lands for forest conservation and for special scientific or natural history interest. Much land still remained unclaimed even after such reserves had been initially set up. The US Department of the Interior held millions of acres in the western states, with Arizona and New Mexico joining the union by 1913. US President Herbert Hoover proposed to deed the surface rights to the unappropriated lands to the states in 1932, but the states complained that the lands had been overgrazed and would also impose a burden during the cash-strapped state budgets. The Bureau of Land Management was created to manage much of that land.

== History of conservation and environmentalism ==
Michael Kraft examines the rise and evolution of conservation and environmental politics and policies. "Conservation" originated in the late 19th century as a movement built around the conservation of natural resources and an attempt to stave off air, water, and land pollution. By the 1970s environmentalism evolved into a much more sophisticated control regime, one that employed the Environmental Protection Agency to slow environmental degradation.

According to Chad Montrie, historians largely agree on the basic points of this account: The conservation of natural resources was a significant topic of debate in the early and mid-20th century, highlighted by a tension between the business sector's push for efficient resource utilization and the advocates for preserving wilderness and natural beauty. In the 1960s and 1970s the conservation movement morphed into modern environmentalism. The seminal moment that ignited the transition occurred in 1962 with the publication of Rachel Carson's groundbreaking book, Silent Spring. Carson's urgent message warned about the perils of harmful chemical pollutants, notably substances like DDT with immediate benefits but long-term detrimental impacts, resonated with an educated audience deeply concerned about quality-of-life issues. The environmental awakening spurred by Carson's work was further fueled by events like the 1969 televised oil spill off the California coast. It prompted many to join mainstream environmental organizations led by visionaries such as David Brower of the Sierra Club. The momentum was bolstered by the inaugural Earth Day in 1970. President Richard Nixon took proactive steps through executive actions and collaboration with Congress to enact pivotal legislation establishing regulatory frameworks that curbed air and water pollution and mitigated adverse effects of corporate greed and rampant consumerism. The emergence of a more radical activism came in the late 1970s and early 1980s, exemplified by chemical disaster at Love Canal in 1977, and a battle in 1982 against a PCB toxic waste dump in a Black community in North Carolina.

The result was confrontational grassroots environmentalism that marked the genesis of the "environmental justice" movement. It focused on issues of toxic substances and addressing concerns of "environmental racism." The term “environmental racism” refers to the way in which people of color are often not valued the same as their White counterparts, and how these standings effect the environment around these communities. It describes how state and corporate policies, practices, and initiatives may target communities of color, putting the burden of environmental degradation on their land. Therefore, “environmental racism” is institutional policies and practices that affect the health outcomes and living conditions of people and communities differently and unequally due to their race and color. The collective efforts during this period laid a foundation for ongoing environmental advocacy and policy development aimed at safeguarding our planet for future generations.

=== Conservation Movement ===
The term "conservation" was coined by American forester Gifford Pinchot in 1907. He told his close friend President Theodore Roosevelt who used it for a national Conference of Governors in 1908 gained national attention regarding priorities for conservation.

==== Origins ====
The American movement received its inspiration from 19th century Romantic writings that exalted the inherent value of nature, quite apart from human usage. Author Henry David Thoreau (1817–1862) made key philosophical contributions that exalted nature. Thoreau was interested in peoples' relationship with nature and studied this by living close to nature in a simple life. He published his experiences in the book Walden, which argued that people should become intimately close with nature. British and German standards were also influential in designing American policies and training. Bernhard Fernow (1851–1923) emigrated from Germany in 1876 and became was the third chief of the Department of Agriculture's Division of Forestry, 1886 to 1898. He helped design what in 1905 became the Forest Service. Carl A. Schenck (1868–1955), another German expert, migrated to the United States in 1895 and helped shape the education of foresters.

==== Progressivism: Efficiency, Equity and Esthetics ====
According to historians Samuel P. Hays and Clayton Koppes, the conservation movement was launched into the national political arena in 1908 by President Theodore Roosevelt and his top advisor Gifford Pinchot. It represented the essence of the Progressive Era and therefore was driven by the primary values of efficiency, equity, and esthetics. Efficiency was to be achieved by full-time experts in the federal bureaucracy (headed by Pinchot) who would use the latest scientific results to manage the public domain to eliminate waste. These disinterested experts would prevent the corruption sought by selfish business interests. Equity meant that natural resources were the province of all the people and should not be plundered by special interests. Instead, resources should be apportioned broadly and equitably. However "all the people" in practice meant white farm owners and ranchers who obtained a free water supply or access to free grazing land.

The esthetic theme was an appeal to and upscale white tourists who wanted a taste of wilderness. Wild and scenic lands should be set aside in national parks, not for their intrinsic value, but to provide free recreation, refresh the spirit weakened by urbanization, and even upgrade "sissies" into virile outdoorsmen. In the Great Depression of the 1930s the New Deal of President Franklin D. Roosevelt expanded the E-E-E tradition to include poor whites, with his key advisors being Harry Hopkins and Harold L. Ickes. The main programs reached two million poor unemployed young men through the Civilian Conservation Corps, while the Tennessee Valley Authority to modernize millions of traditional people trapped in an impoverished, isolated region.

=== Competing ideologies ===
Both conservationists and preservationists spoke out in political debates during the Progressive Era (the 1890s–early 1920s), with an opposition emerging in the 1920s. There were three main positions.

- Laissez-faire: The laissez-faire position first developed in 1776 by Adam Smith argued that owners of private property—including lumber, oil and mining companies, should be allowed to do anything they wished on their properties. Critics warned that this pro-business policy leads to lower prices, mass consumption, waste, and the exhaustion of natural resources. and
- Conservationists: The conservationists, led by Theodore Roosevelt and his close allies George Bird Grinnell and Gifford Pinchot, were motivated by the wanton waste that was taking place at the hand of market forces, including logging and hunting. This practice resulted in placing a large number of North American game species on the edge of extinction. Roosevelt recognized that the laissez-faire approach was too wasteful and inefficient. In any case, they noted, most of the natural resources in the western states were already owned by the federal government. The best course of action, they argued, was a long-term plan devised by national experts to maximize the long-term economic benefits of natural resources. To accomplish the mission, Roosevelt and Grinnell formed the Boone and Crockett Club, whose members were some of the best minds and influential men of the day. Its contingency of conservationists, scientists, politicians, and intellectuals became Roosevelt's closest advisers during his march to preserve wildlife and habitat across North America.
- Preservationists: Preservationists, led by John Muir (1838–1914), argued that the conservation policies were not strong enough to protect the interest of the natural world because they continued to focus on the natural world as a source of economic production.

The debate between conservation and preservation reached its peak in the public debates over the construction of California's Hetch Hetchy dam in Yosemite National Park which supplies the water supply of San Francisco. Muir, leading the Sierra Club, declared that the valley must be preserved for the sake of its beauty: "No holier temple has ever been consecrated by the heart of man."

President Roosevelt put conservationist issues high on the national agenda. He worked with all the major figures of the movement, especially his chief advisor on the matter, Gifford Pinchot and was deeply committed to efficiency in conserving natural resources. He encouraged the Newlands Reclamation Act of 1902 to promote federal construction of dams to irrigate small farms and placed 230 million acres (360,000 mi^{2} or 930,000 km^{2}) under federal protection. Roosevelt set aside more federal land for national parks and nature preserves than all of his predecessors combined.

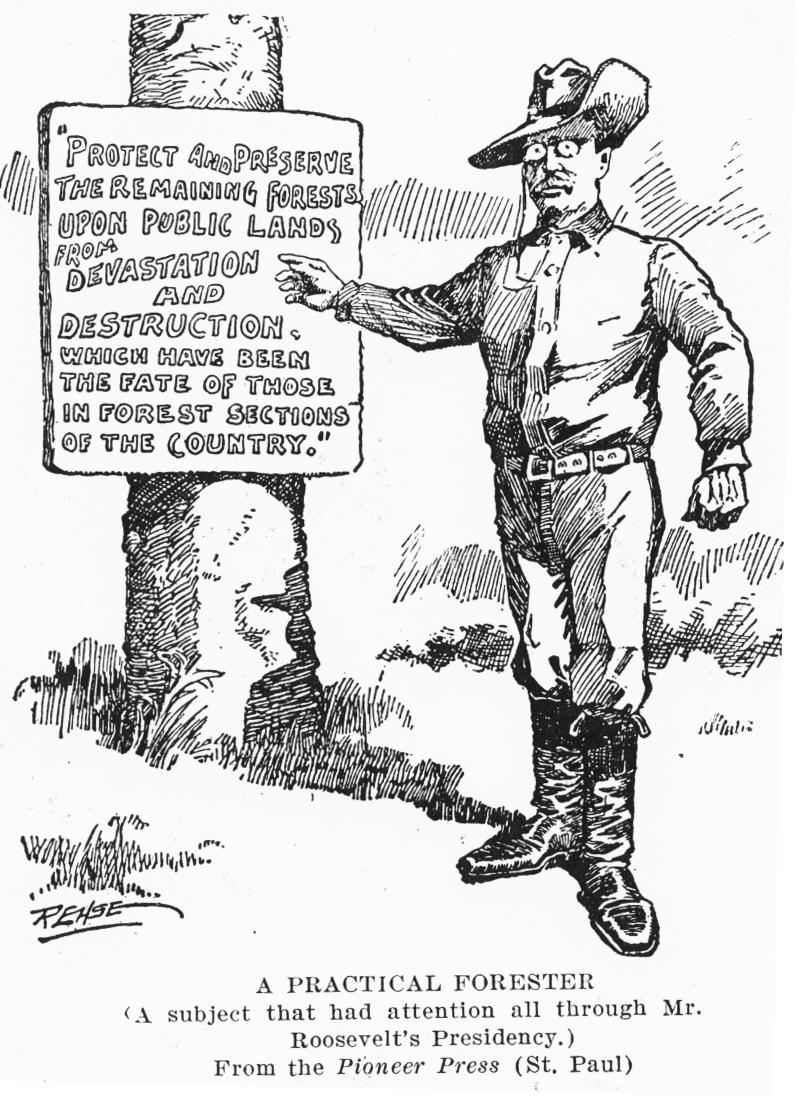
Roosevelt was a leader in conservation, fighting to end the waste of natural resources.

Roosevelt established the United States Forest Service, signed into law the creation of five national parks, and signed the 1906 Antiquities Act, under which he proclaimed 18 new national monuments. He also established the first 51 bird reserves, four game preserves, and 150 national forests, including Shoshone National Forest, the nation's first. The area of the United States that he placed under public protection totals approximately 230,000,000 acres (930,000 km^{2}).

Gifford Pinchot had been appointed by McKinley as chief of Division of Forestry in the Department of Agriculture. In 1905, his department gained control of the national forest reserves. Pinchot promoted private use (for a fee) under federal supervision. In 1907, Roosevelt designated 16 million acres (65,000 km^{2}) of new national forests just minutes before a deadline.

In May 1908, Roosevelt sponsored the Conference of Governors held in the White House, with a focus on natural resources and their most efficient use. Roosevelt delivered the opening address: "Conservation as a National Duty".

In 1903, Roosevelt toured the Yosemite Valley with John Muir, who had a very different view of conservation, and tried to minimize commercial use of water resources and forests. Working through the Sierra Club he founded, Muir succeeded in 1905 in having Congress transfer the Mariposa Grove and Yosemite Valley to the federal government. While Muir wanted nature preserved for its own sake, Roosevelt subscribed to Pinchot's formulation, "to make the forest produce the largest amount of whatever crop or service will be most useful, and keep on producing it for generation after generation of men and trees."

Theodore Roosevelt's view on conservationism remained dominant for decades. For example, the New Deal under Franklin D. Roosevelt authorised the building of many large-scale dams and water projects, as well as the expansion of the National Forest System to buy out sub-marginal farms. In 1937, the Pittman–Robertson Federal Aid in Wildlife Restoration Act was signed into law, providing funding for state agencies to carry out their conservation efforts.

=== Environmentalism ===
"Environmentalism" emerged on the national agenda in 1970, with Republican Richard Nixon playing a major role, especially with his creation of the Environmental Protection Agency. From 1962 to 1998, the grass roots movement founded 772 national organizations focused primarily on environmental protection or pollution abatement. Furthermore, many other organizations adopted such goals in addition to their primary goal, such as the American Lung Association. Using a broad definition, Jason T. Carmichael, J. Craig Jenkins, and Robert J. Brulle identified over 6,000 national and regional organizations, plus another 20,000 or more at the local and state levels that were working on behalf of a multitude of environmental causes in the year 2000.

=== Fears about Agricultural Land Adequacy ===
According to historian Tim Lehman, concerns were first raised in the 20th century regarding the long-term adequacy of the nation's agricultural lands. At the federal level studies were made and programs were proposed and some launched to preserve farmlands from conversion to other uses. An awareness of the need for agricultural conservation followed a history of agricultural abundance, as seen in the rapid settlement of western lands in the 1850s to 1880s. The new theme emerged in the Progressive conservation movement, in Hugh Hammond Bennett's soil conservation crusade, and the land utilization movement of the 1920s. The New Deal made a major national program of land use planning. A land acquisition program, soil conservation districts, and county land use planning agreement all contained elements of federal agricultural land use planning, but none of these policies were entirely successful. Scarcity issues faded during the 1950s and 1960s as agricultural productivity soared. The publication of Rachel Carson's Silent Spring in 1962 energized the environmental movement and brought a new awareness in how industrialized agriculture misused the available land with dangerous chemicals. Decades of suburbanization, rapid national and global population growth, renewed worries about soil erosion, fears of oil and water shortages, and the sudden increase in farm exports beginning in 1972 all were worrisome threats to the long-term supply of good farmland. The Carter administration in the late 1970s supported initiatives like the National Agricultural Lands Survey and liberals in Congress introduced legislation to control suburban sprawl. However the Reagan administration and the Department of Agriculture were opposed to new regulations, and no major program was enacted.

=== Laissez-faire and the Sagebrush Rebellion ===
The success of Reagan in 1980 was facilitated by the rise of popular opposition to public lands reform and a return to laissez-faire ideology. For example, out west in the 1970s the Sagebrush Rebellion arose, demanding less environmental regulation. Conservatives drew on new organizational networks of think tanks such as The Heritage Foundation, as well as well-funded industry groups, the Republican Party state organizations, and new right-wing citizen-oriented grass-roots organizations. They deployed the traditional strategy based on the rights of owners to control their property; on the protection of mineral extraction rights; and on the right to hunt and recreate and to pursue happiness unencumbered by the federal government at the expense of resource conservation.

Reagan's top appointments in the environment field were James G. Watt as Secretary of the Interior and Anne Gorsuch as head of the EPA. They tried to help the Reagan agenda by slashing spending and lowering morale. Both proved incompetent at the jobs; they picked fights with friends and foes and soon made fools of themselves. Environmentalists seized on their opportunity and made Watt and Gorsuch the centerpiece of their campaigns of ridicule. Reagan realized his mistake and fired the two. He appointed a close friend and troubleshooter, William Clark at Interior. Clark successfully turned off the spotlight and kept the peace. At EPA, Reagan appointed William Ruckelshaus, the EPA's first director and a committed environmentalist. He reversed Gorsuch's policies. Vice President George H. W. Bush typically kept close to Reagan on most issues but in this area he announced that if elected he would be the nation's "environmental president." The long run results of Reagan's two terms were to undermine laissez-faire rhetoric and mobilize the membership, funding and momentum of the environmental movement.

=== Historiographical debates ===
William Cronon has criticized advocates for assuming that "wilderness" and "nature" have a reality beyond their creation in the human imagination. This has upset many environmentalists. Cronon writes, "wilderness serves as the unexamined foundation on which so many of the quasi-religious values of modern environmentalism rest." He argues that "to the extent that we live in an urban-industrial civilization but at the same time pretend to ourselves that our real home is in the wilderness, to just that extent we give ourselves permission to evade responsibility for the lives we actually lead."

== Role of federal government ==
=== Interior Department ===
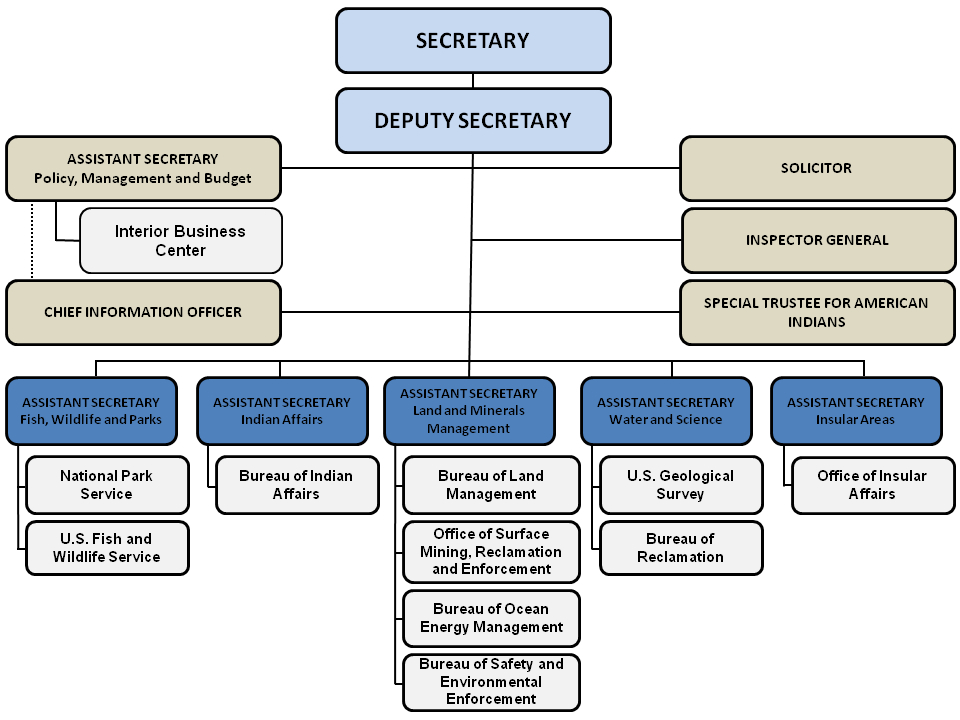
Organization chart of the Department of Interior as of 2013

Most of the agencies dealing with conservation (before 1970) and environmentalism (since 1970) are based in the Interior Department, formed in 1849.

The National Park Service was created in 1916. It included Yellowstone National Park, which in 1872 became the world's first national park. In 1956, the Fish and Wildlife Service became the manager of lands reserved for wildlife. The Grazing Service and the United States General Land Office were combined to create the Bureau of Land Management in 1946. In 1976 the Federal Land Policy and Management Act became the national policy for retaining public land for federal ownership.

It is responsible for the management and conservation of most federal lands and natural resources. It also administers programs relating to Native Americans, Alaska Natives, Native Hawaiians, territorial affairs, and insular areas of the United States, as well as programs related to historic preservation. As of mid-2004, the department managed 507 million acres (2,050,000 km^{2}) of surface land, or about one-fifth of the land in the United States. It manages 476 dams and 348 reservoirs through the Bureau of Reclamation, 434 national parks, monuments, historical sites, etc. through the National Park Service, and 544 national wildlife refuges through the Fish and Wildlife Service.

=== Agriculture Department and Forestry ===
From the early 1900s to the present, there has been a fierce rivalry over control of forests between the Department of Agriculture and the Department of the Interior. From 1905 to the present the main forestry unit has been in the Department of Agriculture.

The concept of national forests was born from Theodore Roosevelt's conservation group, Boone and Crockett Club, due to concerns regarding poaching Yellowstone National Park beginning as early as 1875. In 1876, Congress formed the office of Special Agent in the Department of Agriculture to assess the quality and conditions of forests in the United States. Franklin B. Hough was appointed the head of the office. In 1881, the office was expanded into the newly formed Division of Forestry. The Forest Reserve Act of 1891 authorized withdrawing land from the public domain as forest reserves managed by the Department of the Interior. However, the Transfer Act of 1905 transferred the management of forest reserves from the United States General Land Office of the Interior Department to the Bureau of Forestry in the Agriculture department under the new name United States Forest Service. Gifford Pinchot was the first United States Chief Forester in the Presidency of Theodore Roosevelt.

Significant federal legislation affecting the Forest Service includes the Weeks Act of 1911, the Taylor Grazing Act of 1934, P.L. 73-482; the Multiple Use – Sustained Yield Act of 1960, P.L. 86-517; the Wilderness Act, P.L. 88-577; the National Forest Management Act, P.L. 94-588; the National Environmental Policy Act, P.L. 91–190; the Cooperative Forestry Assistance Act, P.L. 95-313; and the Forest and Rangelands Renewable Resources Planning Act, P.L. 95-307.

=== Army Corps of Engineers and dam building ===
The Army Corps of Engineers is in charge of navigable waterways, and has built many of the major dams.

=== Tennessee Valley Authority ===
The Tennessee Valley Authority (TVA) is a federally owned electric utility coverings all of Tennessee and portions of nearby states. The TVA was created in 1933 as part of a New Deal agency to build dams on the Tennessee River to provide flood control, electricity generation, fertilizer manufacturing, regional planning, and economic development to the Tennessee Valley. The region was a very poor part of Appalachia and out of contact with the modern industrial and agricultural economy. Unlike private utility companies TVA was envisioned as regional economic development agency that would work to help modernize the region's economy and society. Its chairman Arthur Morgan was a visionary, who wanted a model for modernizing traditional society. Some New Dealers hoped it would be a model for other regions, but others strongly disagreed and the president was undecided. Any hope for opening "Seven Little TVAs" across the country died when conservatives regained control of Congress in 1938 and ended liberal experimentation.

=== Environmental Protection Agency ===
The U.S. Environmental Protection Agency (EPA) is an independent federal agency created by an executive order of President President Nixon in 1970 and is part of the executive branch of the government. It reports to the president and was not created by act of Congress. The primary mission of the EPA is to protect human health and safeguard the natural environment (air, water and land) of the nation.

The EPA was established to combine into a single agency many of the existing federal government activities of research and development, monitoring, setting of standards, compliance and enforcement related to protection of the environment. Its most important role is to evaluate every Environmental impact statement that is required whenever a federal role is involved. Thereby EPA has the power to demand changes from most federal agencies to protect the environment according to EPA's standards. In addition, the Environmental impact statement allows a public role—private citizen watchdogs can and often do sue to tie up proposed non-government projects for years.

In 2000 to 2010 the budget held fairly steady at $7.6 to $8.4 billion (with no adjustment for inflation). In terms of objectives, 13% is budgeted for clean air and global climate change, 36% for clean and safe water, 24% for land preservation and restoration, 17% for healthy communities and ecosystems, and 11% for compliance and environmental stewardship. In 2008 it had a staff of about 18,000 people in headquarters and departmental or divisional offices, 10 regional offices, and over 25 laboratories located across the nation. More than half of the staff are engineers, scientists and environmental protection specialists. The others include legal counsel, financial, public affairs and computer specialists.

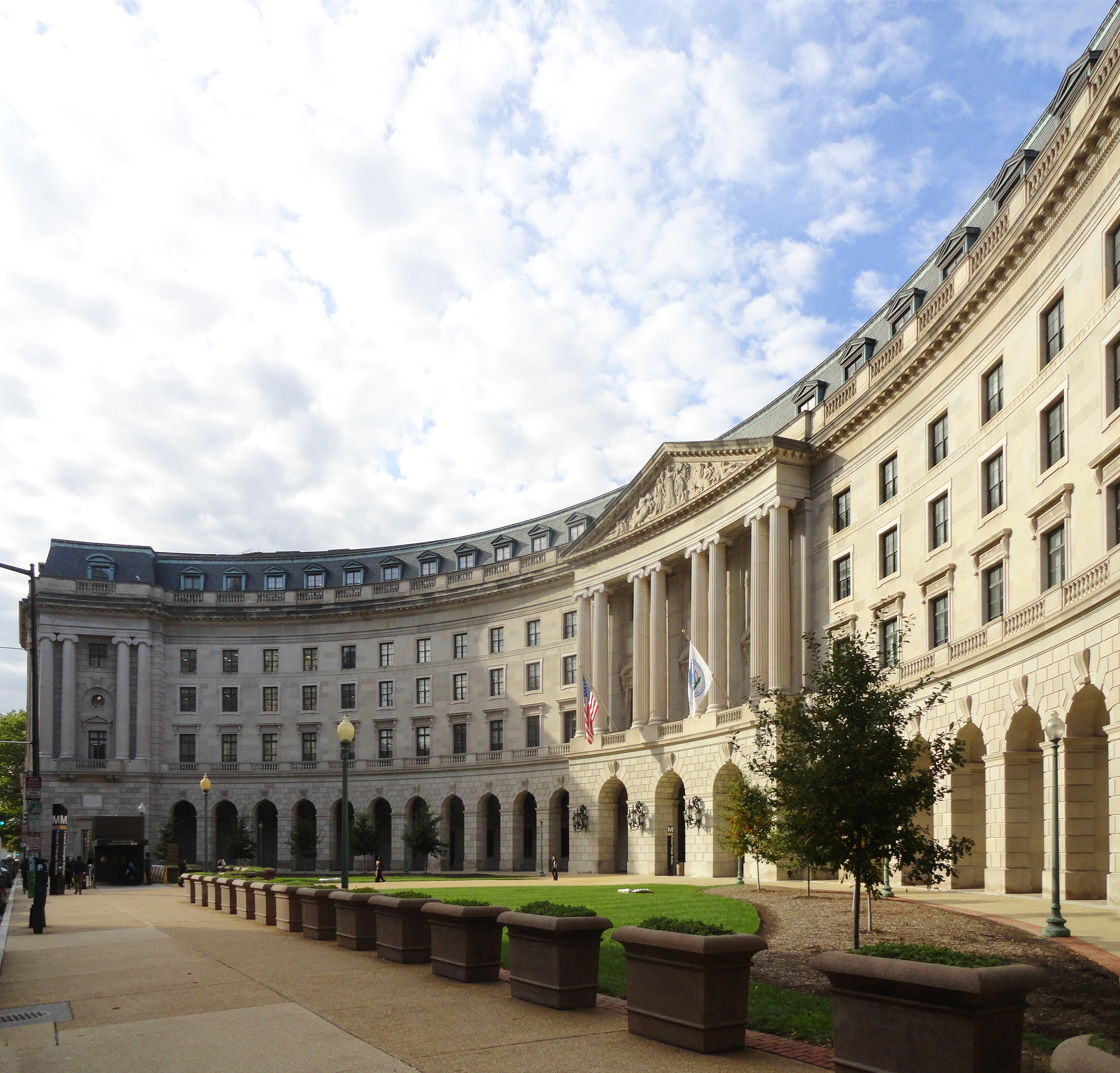
EPA Headquarters in Washington, D.C.

President Nixon, on July 9, 1970, told Congress of his plan to create the EPA by combining parts of three federal departments, three bureaus, three administrations and many other offices into the new single, independent agency to be known as the Environmental Protection Agency. Congress had 60 days to reject the proposal, but opinion was favorable and the reorganization took place without legislation. On December 2, 1970, the EPA was officially established and began operation under director William Ruckelshaus. The EPA began by consolidating 6550 employees from different agencies in several cabinet-level departments into a new agency with a $1.4 billion budget.

Kraft notes that despite its limited charter from 1970, over time EPA has expanded its regulatory function and jousted with the forces of business and economic development. Kraft considers the next major transition in environmental policy to be the process of insuring the "sustainability" of resources through a coalition of interests ranging from policymakers to business leaders, scholars, and individual citizens. At the turn of the 21st century, these often competing groups were wrestling with disparate environmental, economic, and social values.

Russell shows that from 1970 to 1993, the EPA devoted more of its resources to human health issues, notably cancer prevention, than to the protection of nonhuman species. The limited scope of environmental protection was due to a variety of reasons. An institutional culture favored human health issues because most employees were trained in this area. The emphasis on cancer came from the legal division's discovery that judges were more persuaded by arguments about the carcinogenicity of chemicals than by threats to nonhumans. The views of the agency leaders, who followed politically realistic courses, also played an important part in shaping the EPA's direction. Those supporting ecological issues acquired a new tool in the 1980s with the development of risk assessments so that advocates of ecological protection could use language framed by advocates of human health to protect the environment.

=== Complaints about federal management ===
Complaints about federal management of public lands constantly roil relations between public lands users (ranchers, miners, researchers, off-road vehicle enthusiasts, hikers, campers and conservation advocates) and the agencies and environmental regulation on the other. Ranchers complain that grazing fees are too high and that grazing regulations are too onerous despite environmentalist complaints that the opposite is true and that promised improvements to grazing on federal lands do not occur. Miners complain of restricted access to claims, or to lands to prospect. Researchers complain of the difficulty of getting research permits, only to encounter other obstacles in research, including uncooperative permit-holders and, especially in archaeology, vandalized sites with key information destroyed. Off-road vehicle users want free access, but hikers and campers and conservationists complain grazing is not regulated enough and that some mineral lease holders abuse other lands or that off-road vehicle destroy the resource. Each complaint has a long history.

== White House roles ==
=== Theodore Roosevelt presidency 1901–1909 ===
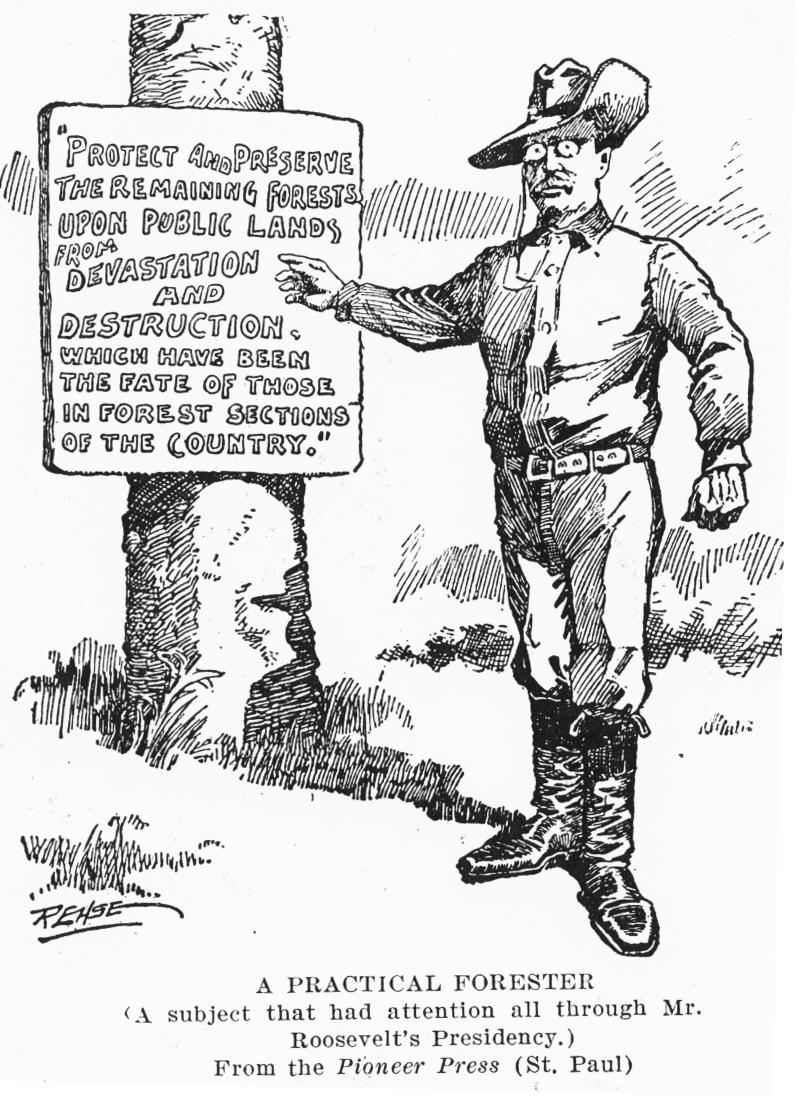
A 1908 editorial cartoon describing Roosevelt's creed as "a practical forester"

Conservation was a minor issue for most presidents. Theodore Roosevelt carved a leadership role that several successors followed.

Roosevelt was a prominent conservationist, putting the issue high on his national agenda. He changed the land by creating 50 wildlife refuges, 18 national monuments, and five national parks, and above all by publicizing conservation issues. Roosevelt's conservation efforts were aimed not just at environment protection, but also at ensuring that society as a whole, rather than just select individuals or companies, benefited from the country's natural resources. His key adviser on conservation matters was Gifford Pinchot, the head of the Bureau of Forestry. Roosevelt increased Pinchot's power over environmental issues by transferring control over national forests from the Department of the Interior to the Bureau of Forestry, which was part of the Agriculture Department. Pinchot's agency was renamed to the United States Forest Service, and Pinchot presided over the implementation of assertive conservationist policies in national forests. Under William Howard Taft, Pinchot had a heavily publicized dispute over environmental policy with Secretary of the Interior Richard A. Ballinger that led to Pinchot's dismissal and to Roosvelt's break with Taft in 1912.

Roosevelt relied on the Newlands Reclamation Act of 1902, which promoted federal construction of dams to irrigate small farms and placed 230 million acres (360,000 mi^{2} or 930,000 km^{2}) under federal protection. In 1906, Congress passed the Antiquities Act, granting the president the power to create national monuments in federal lands. Roosevelt set aside more federal land, national parks, and nature preserves than all of his predecessors combined. Roosevelt established the Inland Waterways Commission to coordinate construction of water projects for both conservation and transportation purposes, and in 1908 he hosted the Conference of Governors. This was the first time governors had ever met together and the goal was to boost and coordinate support for conservation. Roosevelt then established the National Conservation Commission to take an inventory of the nation's natural resources.

==== Conference of Governors, 1908 ====
To reach a broad national audience of state leaders, and obtain heavy media coverage, President Roosevelt sponsored the first ever Conference of Governors. It was held in the White House May 13–15, 1908. Pinchot, at that time Chief Forester of the U.S., was the primary mover of the conference, and a progressive conservationist, who strongly believed in the scientific and efficient management of natural resources on the federal level. He was also a prime mover of the previous Inland Waterways Commission, which recommended such a meeting the previous October.

The focus of the conference was on natural resources and their proper use. Roosevelt delivered the opening address: "Conservation as a National Duty." Among those speaking were leading industrialists, such as James J. Hill, politicians, and resource experts. Andrew Carnegie, a leading philanthropist was in attendance. The speeches emphasized both the nation's need to exploit renewable resources and the differing situations of the various states, requiring different plans. This Conference was a seminal event in the history of conservationism; it brought the issue to public attention in a highly visible way. The next year saw two outgrowths of the Conference: the National Conservation Commission, which Roosevelt and Pinchot set up with representatives from the states and Federal agencies, and the First National Conservation Commission, which Pinchot led as an assembly of private conservation interests.

==== Opposition ====
Roosevelt's policies faced opposition from both liberal environmental activists like John Muir and conservative proponents of laissez-faire like Senator Henry M. Teller of Colorado. While Muir, the founder of the Sierra Club, wanted nature preserved for the sake of pure beauty, Roosevelt subscribed to Pinchot's formulation, "to make the forest produce the largest amount of whatever crop or service will be most useful, and keep on producing it for generation after generation of men and trees." Teller and other opponents of conservation, meanwhile, believed that conservation would prevent the economic development of the West and feared the centralization of power in Washington. The backlash to Roosevelt's ambitious policies prevented further conservation efforts in the final years of Roosevelt's presidency and would later contribute to the Pinchot–Ballinger controversy during the Taft administration.

=== Franklin D. Roosevelt presidency, 1933–1945 ===
Franklin D. Roosevelt had a lifelong interest in the environment and conservation starting with his youthful interest in forestry on his family estate. Although he was never an outdoorsman or sportsman on the scale of his distant cousin Theodore Roosevelt, their presidential roles in conservation were comparable. When Franklin was Governor of New York, the Temporary Emergency Relief Administration was a state-level system that became the model for his federal Civilian Conservation Corps, with 10,000 or more men building fire trails, combating soil erosion and planting tree seedlings in marginal farmland in upstate New York. The governor worked closely with Harry Hopkins and in 1933 brought Hopkins to Washington to use the New York experience to shape the national programs of work relief.

Roosevelt's New Deal was active in expanding, funding, and promoting the National Park and National Forest systems. Their popularity soared, from three million visitors a year at the start of the decade to 15.5 million in 1939. Every state had its own state parks, and Roosevelt made sure that WPA and CCC projects were set up to upgrade them as well as the national systems.

From 1933 to 1942, the Civilian Conservation Corps (CCC) enrolled 3.4 million young men for six months service. It built 13,000 miles (21,000 kilometres) of trails, planted two billion trees, and upgraded 125,000 miles (201,000 kilometres) of dirt roads. CCC made permanent "improvements" on 118 million acres (triple the size of Connecticut). A 1936 CCC press release claimed it "greatly increased the value of the forest and added to its usefulness to the public," while CCC Director Robert Fechner boasted in his 1939 annual report, the Corps had "constructively altered the landscape of the United States." Even more important to the New Deal's ambitions, it clothed, fed, housed and gave medical, dental, and eye care, as well as vigorous outdoor exercise, to unemployed urban youth who needed help that their poverty stricken families could not provide. Furthermore, the parents received $25 a month while their sones were away. Likewise Arno B. Cammere, the energetic head of the National Park system, realized that helping solve the unemployment crisis was Roosevelt's main goal. The conservation projects of the Park and Forest services were dramatically expanded.

According to Richard Lowitt, the New Deal Interior Department led by Secretary Harold L. Ickes, emphasized economic benefits from hydroelectric power. The department sought to build "the foundations for a more stable economy in the West that would expand enormously and bring in its wake a rising standard of living, increased population, and a greater measure of equality with other sections of the country". The New Deal ignored the fears of the upper-class purists who realized their single goal of preserving wilderness instead of "improving" it was being undermined.

=== Wartime and postwar: 1942–1953 ===
When unemployment practically ended in 1942, many of the New Deal agencies closed down permanently, including the WPA and CCC. New conservation programs were put on hold unless they contributed to the war effort. The Army Corps of Engineers turned to military construction and took charge of building the atomic bomb. The TVA played a major role in producing the uranium and plutonium used in the bombs dropped on Hiroshima and Nagasaki. Vice President took over when Roosevelt died in April 1945. Truman never enjoyed his youth on the farm and had no interest in the outdoors, nor did his Interior Secretary Oscar L. Chapman. However both Truman and Chapman were keenly aware of the patronage advantages to the Democratic Party in large dam projects. They sponsored a major expansion with no concern for negative environmental impact. After the war ended the Corps of Engineers built 400 dams and 3400 flood control projects, while TVA added 4 dams, and the Bureau of Reclamation added 41.

=== Eisenhower presidency, 1953–1961 ===
Water projects continued at a fast pace, with 11,000 new dams in the 1950s and 19,000 in the 1960s. The "Big Dam Era" was made possible by very expensive combinations of high dams, powerful turbines, and high-tension long-distance transmission lines whereby electrical utilities brought power to customers hundreds of miles away. The era began in the 1930s and was practically over by 1970.

Meanwhile, the environmental movement was starting to form. Aldo Leopold published a highly influential book in 1949, A Sand County Almanac, which helped define environmental ethics. It eventually sold more than two million copies.

In terms of ideology, liberals (and the Democratic Party) wanted national control of natural resources—the level at which organized ideological pressures were effective. Conservatives (and the Republican Party) wanted state or local control, whereby the financial benefit to local businesses and jobs could be decisive. In a debate going back to the early 20th century, preservationists wanted to protect the inherent natural beauty of the national parks, whereas economic maximizers wanted to build dams and divert water flows. Eisenhower articulated the conservative position in December 1953, declaring that conservation was not about "locking up and putting resources beyond the possibility of wastage or usage," but instead involved "the intelligent use of all the resources we have, for the welfare and benefit of all the American people." Liberals and environmentalists forced the resignation of Secretary of the Interior Douglas McKay in 1956. He was a businessman with little interest in the environment who allegedly promoted "giveaways" to mining companies regardless of environmental damage.

Eisenhower's personal activity on environmental issues came in foreign policy. He supported the UN convention of 1958 that provided a strong foundation for international accords governing the use of the world's high seas, especially regarding fishing interests. Eisenhower also promoted the peaceful use of atomic energy for the production of electricity, with strong controls against diversion into nuclear weapons. However, there was little attention to nuclear waste.

=== Kennedy and Johnson presidencies, 1961–1968 ===
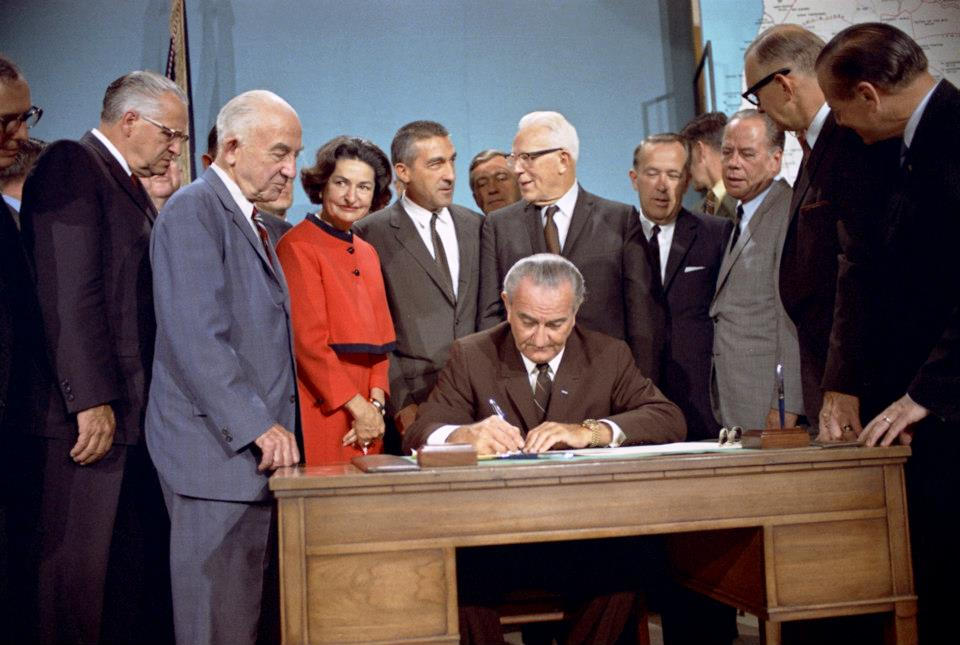
President Johnson signs the National Wild and Scenic Rivers Act into law, October, 1968. His wife Lady Bird Johnson is in red.

John F. Kennedy was a city boy like his constituents. He did not hunt or fish, hike or explore, nor seek out the wilderness. He did greatly enjoy the ocean and the seashore but otherwise the environment and environmentalism bored him.

The 1962 publication of Silent Spring by Rachel Carson brought new attention to environmentalism and the danger that pollution and pesticide poisoning (i.e., DDT) posed to public health.

When Vice President Lyndon B. Johnson succeeded the assassinated president in November 1963, he retained Kennedy's staunchly pro-environment Secretary of the Interior, Stewart Udall. Johnson helped pass a series a series of bills designed to protect the environment. He signed into law the Clean Air Act of 1963, which had been proposed by Kennedy. The Clean Air Act set emission standards for stationary emitters of air pollutants and directed federal funding to air quality research. In 1965, the act was amended by the Motor Vehicle Air Pollution Control Act, which directed the federal government to establish and enforce national standards for controlling the emission of pollutants from new motor vehicles and engines. In 1967, Johnson and Senator Edmund Muskie led passage of the Air Quality Act of 1967, which increased federal subsidies for state and local pollution control programs.

During his time as president, Johnson signed over 300 conservation measures into law, forming the legal basis of the modern environmental movement. In September 1964, he signed a law establishing the Land and Water Conservation Fund, which aids the purchase of land used for federal and state parks. That same month, Johnson signed the Wilderness Act, which established the National Wilderness Preservation System; saving 9.1 million acres of forestland from industrial development.

In 1965, Muskie led passage of the Water Quality Act of 1965, though conservatives stripped a provision of the act that would have given the federal government the authority to set clean water standards. The Endangered Species Preservation Act of 1966, the first piece of comprehensive endangered species legislation, authorizes the Secretary of the Interior to list native species of fish and wildlife as endangered and to acquire endangered species habitat for inclusion in the National Wildlife Refuge System. The Wild and Scenic Rivers Act of 1968 established the National Wild and Scenic Rivers System. The system includes more than 220 rivers, and covers more than 13,400 miles of rivers and streams. The National Trails System Act of 1968 created a nationwide system of scenic and recreational trails.

As First Lady and trusted presidential confidant, Lady Bird Johnson helped establish the public environmental movement in the 1960s. She worked to beautify Washington, D.C. by planting thousands of flowers, set up the White House Natural Beauty Conference, and lobbied Congress for the president's full range of environmental initiatives. In 1965, she took the lead in calling for passage of the Highway Beautification Act. The act called for control of outdoor advertising, including removal of certain types of signs, along the nation's growing Interstate Highway System and the existing federal-aid primary highway system. It also required certain junkyards along Interstate or primary highways to be removed or screened and encouraged scenic enhancement and roadside development. According to Secretary of Interior Stewart Udall, she single-handedly, "influenced the president to demand-and support-more far-sighted conservation legislation."

=== Nixon presidency, 1969–1974 ===
Time magazine called Barry Commoner the "Paul Revere of ecology" for his work on the threats to life from the environmental consequences of fallout from nuclear tests and other pollutants of the water, soil, and air. Time's cover on February 2, 1970, represented a "call to arms", to mobilize public opinion by appeals to fears of chemical pollution of food and water. On April 22, 1970, the first Earth Day took place, which saw 20 million Americans demonstrating peacefully in favor of environmental reform, accompanied by special events held at university campuses across the nation. The huge response to Earth Day convinced Richard Nixon that he could expand his political base by championing the new environmental movement. His instincts were right: there was especially strong popular support for the Environmental Protection Agency (EPA) and the Clean Air Act of 1970. Polls showed support was high among men and women of all ages, and among conservatives as well as liberals. The media led the stampede. A survey of 21,000 editorials in 5 major newspapers from October 1970 to September 1971 showed that environmental topics were the number one social issue. The top concerns were water quality, land use, air quality and waste disposal.

Nixon came late to the conservation movement. Environmental policy had not been a significant issue in the 1968 election, and the media rarely asked about the subject. Nixon broke the silence by highlighting the environment in his State of the Union speech in January 1970:

The great question of the seventies is: shall we surrender to our surroundings, or shall we make our peace with nature and begin to make reparations for the damage we have done to our air, to our land, and to our water? Restoring nature to its natural state is a cause beyond party and beyond factions. It has become a common cause of all the people of this country. It is a cause of particular concern to young Americans, because they more than we will reap the grim consequences of our failure to act on programs which are needed now if we are to prevent disaster later. Clean air, clean water, open spaces—these should once again be the birthright of every American. If we act now, they can be.

The president then introduced 36 environmental initiatives and pushed most of them through. He strongly supported advisors who deeply believed in environmentalism, especially Russell E. Train, John Ehrlichman, William Ruckelshaus, and John C. Whitaker.

In June 1970, Nixon announced the formation of the Environmental Protection Agency (EPA), using an Executive order that did not require Congressional approval. Other breakthrough initiatives supported by Nixon included the Clean Air Act of 1970, and the Occupational Safety and Health Administration (OSHA). His National Environmental Policy Act required environmental impact statements for many Federal projects. Furthermore, he put protection of the global environment on the international diplomatic agenda for the first time in world history. Then Nixon reversed himself and in 1972 he vetoed the Clean Water Act —objecting not to the policy goals of the legislation but to the amount of money to be spent on them, which he deemed excessive. After Congress overrode his veto, Nixon impounded the funds he deemed unjustifiable.

==== Nixon's achievements ====
Political scientists Byron Daines and Glenn Sussman identify six major achievements for which they give credit to Nixon.

- He broadened the attention span of the Republican Party to include environmental issues, for the first time since the days of Theodore Roosevelt. He thereby "dislodged the Democratic Party from its position of dominance over the environment."
- He used presidential powers, and promoted legislation in Congress to create a permanent political structure, most notably the Environmental Protection Agency, as well as the White House Council on Environmental Quality, the National Oceanic and Atmospheric Administration, and others.
- He helped ensure that Congress build a permanent structure supportive of environmentalism, especially the National Environmental Policy Act of 1970, which enjoined all federal agencies to help protect the environment.
- Nixon appointed a series of strong environmentalists in highly visible positions, most notably William Ruckelshaus, Russell Train, Russell W. Peterson, and John C. Whitaker (who was a senior White House aide for four years, becoming Undersecretary of the Interior in 1973).
- Nixon initiated worldwide diplomatic attention to environmental issues, working especially with NATO.
- Finally, state: "Nixon did not have to be personally committed to the environment to become one of the most successful presidents in promoting environmental priorities."

Historians pose a strange paradox regarding Nixon. In 1970-1971 he unexpectedly emerged as a great environmentalist who deserves credit for several of the most important environmental laws in American history. By 1972, however, he suddenly moved far to the right, despising environmentalists as left-wing fanatics who would bankrupt the economy.

For subsequent presidents see Environmental policy of the United States.

== Organizations ==
There are a multitude of environmental organizations—over 160 are covered at the List of environmental and conservation organizations in the United States. However the "Group of Ten" (or "Big Green") have been preeminent since the late 20th century: Sierra Club (founded 1892); Audubon (founded 1905); National Parks Conservation Association (1919); Izaak Walton League (1922); National Wildlife Federation (1936); The Wilderness Society (1937); Environmental Defense Fund (1967); Friends of the Earth (1969); Natural Resources Defense Council (1970); and Earthjustice (1971).

=== Stopping the Echo Park Dam ===
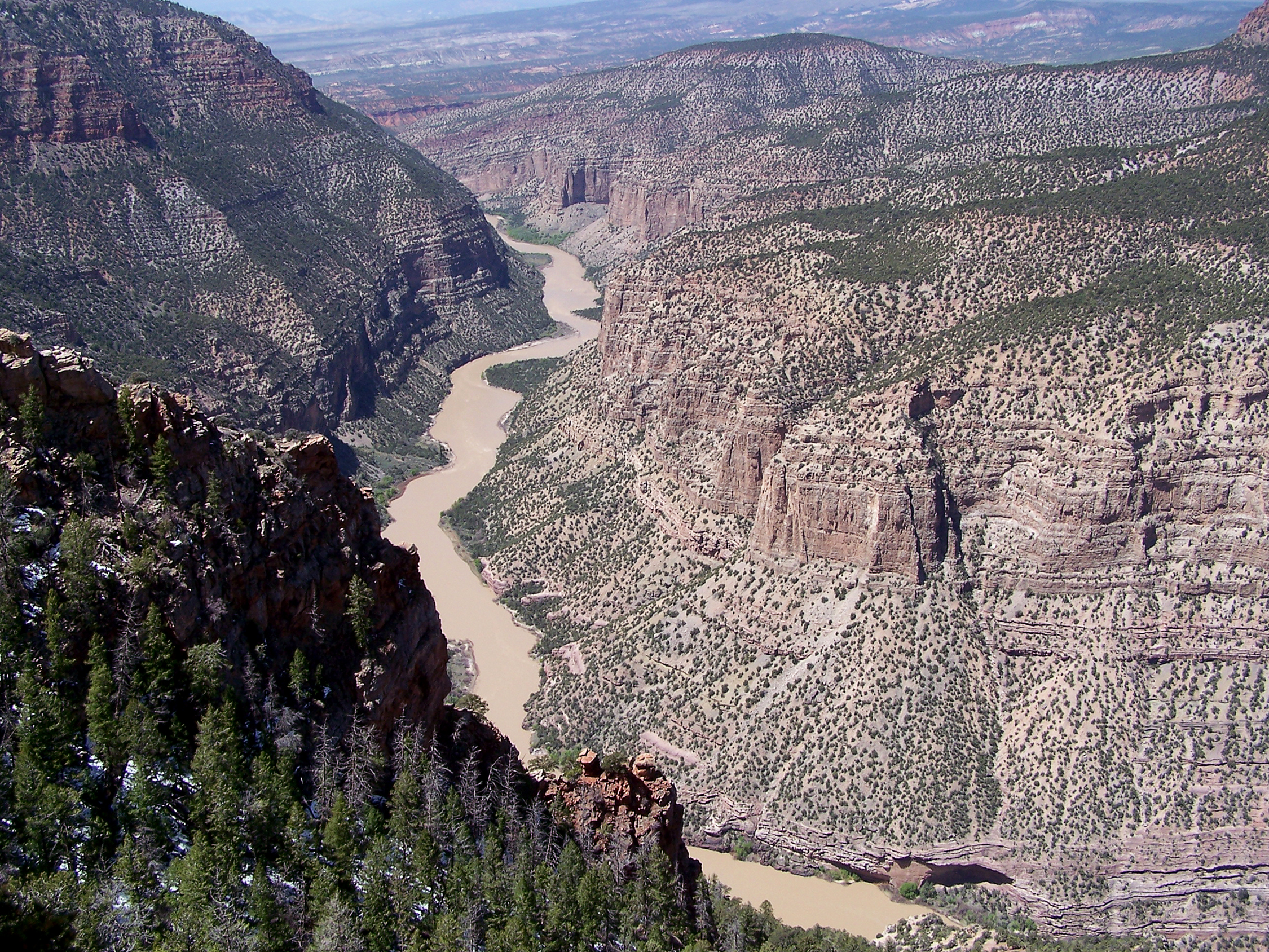
Whirlpool Canyon, which would have been flooded by one of the proposed Echo Park dams.

A critical transition took place after World War II that turned these groups into activist organizations working to save the Wilderness. The clientele for the clubs had been an upper-class conservative Republican audience with close ties to big business. They enjoyed expensive and exotic vacations at uncrowded wilderness sites. Mountain climbing was popular. The older leaders retired and were replaced by men with a mission, especially Howard Zahniser at the Wilderness Society in 1945 and David Brower at the Sierra Club in 1952. They were dismayed at the aggressive plans put forward by the "Iron Triangle" that controlled conservation policy. The Iron Triangle was the informal backstage coalition of key members of Congress, plus leaders of the major federal agencies, plus local businessmen keen on speeding up economic development by using natural resources. After a decade of depression and war, the nation was ready to move ahead. The Bureau of Reclamation took the lead with an elaborate plan to develop dams on the Colorado River for the benefit of the economies of Arizona, California, Colorado, Nevada, New Mexico, Utah, and Wyoming.

The centerpiece would be a huge new Echo Park Dam inside Dinosaur National Monument. Zahniser and Brower, working with 30 other groups, launched recruiting drives to bring in middle class members with idealistic goals to fight the destruction of the wilderness at Echo Park. They raised money for staff; mobilized local branches; and flooded the market with glossy magazines featuring nature photography by the likes of Ansel Adams; and petitioned local, state and national politicians. They convinced Congress to delete Echo Park Dam from the Colorado River Storage Project in 1955, but had to agree on an alternative dam site at Glen Canyon Dam. They went on to oppose other grandiose projects. To make their goals permanent Zahniser drafted an ambition "Wilderness Act" designed to permanently protect 50 million acres of wilderness with no commercial activities such as mining or hydroelectric power dams. In the end he achieved a Wilderness Act in 1964 that protected 9 million acres and set a national standard, while mobilizing grass roots voters and setting a model of activism for other national and local organizations to emulate in challenging the Iron Triangle.

=== The Sierra Club ===
The Sierra Club is a major environmental organization. It was founded in May 1892, by preservationist John Muir (1838–1914). He became the first president, serving for 20 years. The Club did not engage in lobbying. Instead it provided its upscale clientele with outdoor adventures, such as guided tours, wilderness camping and mountain climbing. Reform-minded activists known as the "John Muir Sierrans" wanted a more aggressive role in protecting the environment. They brought in the hyperenergetic and controversial David Brower (1912–2000) as Executive Director 1952 to 1969. The Club now became the first large-scale environmental preservation organization in the world, best known for systematic lobbying of politicians to promote environmentalist policies. Major activities include promoting sustainable energy and mitigating global warming, as well as opposition to the use of coal, hydropower, and nuclear power. The organization takes strong positions on issues that sometimes create controversy, criticism, or opposition either internally or externally or both. The club is known for its political endorsements generally supporting liberal and progressive candidates in elections.

Under Brower's leadership, Sierra's membership grew rapidly, from 7,000 in 1952 to 70,000 members in 1969. It was the largest and most prominent conservation organization. Building on the biennial Wilderness Conferences which the Club launched in 1949 together with The Wilderness Society, Brower helped win passage of the Wilderness Act in 1964. Brower and the Sierra Club also led a major battle to stop the Bureau of Reclamation from building two dams that would flood portions of the Grand Canyon. Brower was keen on publicity and sponsored numerous heavily illustrated books to promote knowledge and admiration for the nation's wilderness. On the other hand, powerful members of Congress fought for new high dams to use water power to promote the local economy, regardless of the flooding they caused to wilderness areas. Their leader in Congress was Wayne N. Aspinall, the Democrat from western Colorado who dominated the House Committee on Interior and Insular Affairs as chairman from 1959 to 1973. Brower complained that the environmental movement had seen "dream after dream dashed on the stony continents of Wayne Aspinall." The congressman shot back that the environmentalists were "over-indulged zealots" and "aristocrats" to whom "balance means nothing."

=== The Wilderness Society ===
The Wilderness Society is a non-profit conservation organization founded in 1937 by Bob Marshall (1901–1939), who largely funded its startup. It is dedicated to protecting natural areas and federal public lands in the United States and advocates for the designation of federal wilderness areas and other protective designations, such as for national monuments. It calls for balanced uses of public lands, and advocate for federal politicians to enact various land conservation and balanced land use proposals. The Society specializes in issues involving lands under the management of federal agencies; such lands include national parks, national forests, national wildlife refuges, and areas overseen by the Bureau of Land Management. In the early 21st century, the society has been active in fighting recent political efforts to reduce protection for America's roadless and undeveloped lands and wildlife. It was instrumental in the passage of the 1964 Wilderness Act. The primary drafter of the Wilderness Act was Howard Zahniser (1906–1964), who served as executive secretary of the Wilderness Society from 1945 until his death. The Wilderness Act led to the creation of the National Wilderness Preservation System, which protects 109 million acres of U.S. public wildlands.

== Activism ==
=== Ecocentrics ===
According to Keith Makoto Woodhouse, the ecocentric movement is controversial and internally divided. It rejects the anthropocentric belief that humans are intrinsically superior to other forms of life, and have the right to rule over and manipulate nature. The ecocentrics focus largely on wilderness preservation. They are highly controversial in their use of direct action-and in their reluctance to engage in standard political activity. For example, the Earth First! activists used Tree spiking—driving long spikes into trees that would destroy sawmills and injure workers. "Ecotage" is the crime of sabotage on behalf of the environment.

=== Environmental justice ===
Environmental justice or eco-justice, is a social movement to address environmental injustice, which occurs when poor or marginalized communities are harmed by hazardous waste, resource extraction, and other land uses from which they do not benefit. Research towards environmental justice began in the 1970s when black residents in Houston, Texas discovered the state was permitting a solid-waste facility site in their community. Findings from this study showed that locations of minority communities were more likely to receive sites of environmentally harmful infrastructure. The movement gained momentum during the 1982 PCB protests in Warren County, North Carolina where black residents and activists resisted a waste facility of 60,000 tons of PCB-contaminated soil. While the protestors were unable to stop the soil dumping, they drew attention to environmental racism and the research and activism of those such as Robert Bullard who studied both Houston and Warren County. The movement was heavily influenced by the American civil rights movement and focused on environmental racism within rich countries. The movement was later expanded to consider gender, international environmental injustice, and inequalities within marginalised groups. As the movement achieved some success in rich countries, environmental burdens were shifted to the Global South (as for example through extractivism or the global waste trade). The movement for environmental justice has thus become more global, with some of its aims now being articulated by the United Nations. The movement overlaps with movements for Indigenous land rights and for the human right to a healthy environment.

The goal of the environmental justice movement is to achieve agency for marginalised communities in making environmental decisions that affect their lives. The global environmental justice movement arises from local environmental conflicts in which environmental defenders frequently confront multi-national corporations in resource extraction or other industries. Local outcomes of these conflicts are increasingly influenced by trans-national environmental justice networks. Environmental justice scholars have produced a large interdisciplinary body of social science literature that includes contributions to political ecology, environmental law, and theories of sustainability.

Instances of environmental injustice and racism are prevalent within the United States. In Flint, Michigan, a majority-Black community where 40 percent of people live in poverty, a major public health crisis and state of emergency was caused by lead seepage into the drinking water. On April 25, 2014, the city switched its water source to the Flint river in a money-saving effort, causing major corrosion of pipes and serious health effects in locals, especially children, and releasing lead into the drinking water. Despite local outcry about visibly discolored water with a notable smell. Throughout the following months, more pollutants were detected and health effects such as lead poisoning in children became apparent, though little to no action was taken by government officials. It was not until September 2015 that a Virginia Tech research team independently tested and found serious lead levels in Flint. After elevated lead levels were found in children by the local medical center, which has serious health impacts, the state provided free water filters and testing before switching back to the original water supply on October 16. However, even by April 2016, Flint's water was still not deemed safe to drink. Criminal charges were filed against nine government officials for their willful and knowing roles in the crisis. Lawsuits were filed against two corporations, Veolia and Lockwood as well as Andrews & Newman. In the city's attempts to save money, the primarily Black community of Flint faced lifelong effects.

Environmental justice serves to defend minority communities who are unjustly affected by environmental impacts. Another instance of environmental racism is the burning of sugar fields in Palm Beach County, Florida, with a population of mostly Black and Latino communities, many living in poverty. Locals have been vocal about the effects of sugar cane burning for decades. When the nearby sugar companies and farmers burn their fields for the benefit of the next crop, locals claim they are constrained to their homes to avoid the falling ash. They cite health concerns including known respiratory illnesses caused by the ash including asthma and lung cancer. However, farmers and companies claim the burns are in accordance with Florida Forest Service regulations. The large sugar companies also claim that they abide by state air quality measures. While the industry generates large revenue and the state claims the county falls within air quality requirements, the locals, lacking the resources to investigate for themselves, complain of effects to their health and impacts on their day-to-day lives from the burns.

Another example of environmental justice, highlighting the intersection of Indigenous rights within the United States, environmental protection, and social equity was the battle between Energy Transfer Partners’ Dakota Access Pipeline and the Standing Rock Sioux Reservation. In April 2016, as the pipeline was posed to be constructed to run beneath Lake Oahe, which Sioux claim would jeopardize their primary water source, and through sacred sites and burial grounds, the Standing Rock Sioux tribe led protests that drew thousands of people and clashed with private security forces, militarized police, and state authority. The Army Corps of Engineers had approved the pipeline construction, claiming that the methods used were safe and that no historic properties would be affected by the pipeline crossing. The protests drew international attention and ended in late February 2017 when those who remained faced arrest. The Standing Rock Sioux continued to challenge Energy Transfer Partners through lawsuits and legal routes. However, the pipeline continued construction and carried crude oil beneath Lake Oahe although the Army Corps, as of 2025, still lack key permits and environmental impact statements.

== Leadership ==
- See American environmentalists, for articles on people in Category:American environmentalists.
- Ansel Adams
- Bruce Babbitt
- David Brower
- Rachel Carson
- Barry Commoner
- William Cronon
- William O. Douglas
- Al Gore
- Harold L. Ickes
- Lady Bird Johnson
- Aldo Leopold
- George Perkins Marsh
- Robert Marshall
- John Muir
- Gifford Pinchot
- Franklin D. Roosevelt
- Theodore Roosevelt
- William Ruckelshaus
- Dorceta Taylor
- Henry David Thoreau
- Russell E. Train
- Stewart Udall
- Howard Zahniser

== See also ==
- Conservation in the United States, history of activism before 1960
  - Forestry
    - List of national forests of the United States
  - History of the lumber industry in the United States
  - Timeline of history of environmentalism, on organized efforts
  - George Perkins Marsh Prize for best book in environmental history
  - Environmental movement in the United States, after 1960
  - Prairie restoration
- Environmental policy of the United States
  - United States Bureau of Reclamation on water policy
  - United States Environmental Protection Agency
  - United States environmental law
  - Pittman–Robertson Federal Aid in Wildlife Restoration Act, of 1937
  - Sagebrush Rebellion, opposition in the Reagan Era
- Environmental issues in the United States, current issues
  - List of environmental issues
  - Environmental justice
  - Environmental protection
  - Environmental science
    - Environmental education in the United States
  - Environmental justice
    - Environmental racism in the United States
  - Grassroots environmental activism in the United States–Mexico borderlands
  - Green New Deal
  - Climate change in the United States
    - Climate change and agriculture in the United States
- Holocene extinction#Americas, extinction of species caused by human action
  - Native American use of fire in ecosystems
- Environmental history, global perspective
  - History of climate change policy and politics
- Rural American history
- Category:Environmental non-fiction books

== Sources ==
- Adelman, S. Allan (1970). "Control of Motor Vehicle Emissions: State or Federal Responsibility?". Catholic University Law Review. 20 (1). Washington, D.C.: Columbus School of Law, The Catholic University of America: 157–170.
- Aitken, Jonathan (1993). Nixon, A Life. Regnery. ISBN 0-89526-489-7.
- Allitt, Patrick (2014). A Climate of Crisis: America in the Age of Environmentalism. Penguin Press. ISBN 978-1594204661.
- Becerra-Valdivia, Lorena; Higham, Thomas (2020). "The timing and impact of the earliest human arrivals in North America". Nature. 584 (7819): 93–97. doi:10.1038/s41586-020-2491-6. PMID 32699413. S2CID 220715918.
- Benson, W. Todd (2003). President Theodore Roosevelt's Conservations Legacy. Infinity. ISBN 0741416115.
- Brinkley, Douglas (2010). Wilderness Warrior: Theodore Roosevelt and the Crusade for America. Harper Collins. ISBN 978-0060565312.
- Brinkley, Douglas (2017). Rightful Heritage: Franklin D. Roosevelt and the Land of America. Harper Perennial. ISBN 978-0062089250.
- Brinkley, Douglas (2022). Silent Spring Revolution: John F. Kennedy, Rachel Carson, Lyndon Johnson, Richard Nixon, and the Great Environmental Awakening. Harper. ISBN 978-0063212916.
- Colman, Zack (February 5, 2021). "Environmental Groups' Greatest Obstacle May Not Be Republican Opposition". Politico.
- Cohen, Michael P. (1988). The History of the Sierra Club, 1892-1970. Sierra Club Books. ISBN 0-87156-732-6.
- Cronon, William (1996). Uncommon Ground: Rethinking the Human Place in Nature. W. W. Norton & Company. p. 80. ISBN 0393315118.
- Dalleck, Robert (2017). Franklin D. Roosevelt: A Political Life. Viking. ISBN 978-0-241-31584-2.
- Daynes, Bryon W.; Sussman, Glen (2010). White House Politics and the Environment: Franklin D. Roosevelt to George W. Bush. Texas A & M University Press. ISBN 978-1603442022.
- Flippen, J. Brooks (2000). Nixon and the Environment. University of New Mexico Press. ISBN 0-8263-1993-9.
- Flippen, J. Brook (2008). "Richard Nixon, Russel Train, and the birth of modern American environmental diplomacy". Diplomatic History. 32 (4): 613–638. doi:10.1111/j.1467-7709.2008.00715.x. JSTOR 24916003.
- Glover, James M.; Glover, Regina B. (1986). "Robert Marshall:Portrait of a Liberal Forester". Journal of Forest History. 30 (3): 112–119. doi:10.2307/4004875. JSTOR 4004875. S2CID 238260831.
- Gottlieb, Robert (2005). Forcing the spring: The transformation of the American environmental movement. Island Press. ISBN 1-55963-122-8.
- Gould, Lewis L. (1988). Lady Bird Johnson: Our Environmental First Lady. University Press of Kansas. ISBN 978-0-7006-3151-3. JSTOR j.ctv1p2gjzg.
- Gould, Lewis L. (2011). The Presidency of Theodore Roosevelt (2 ed.).
- Leshy, John (2009). "FDR's Expansion of Our National Patrimony: A Model for Leadership". In Woolner, David; Henderson, Henry L. (eds.). FDR and the Environment. Springer. pp. 177–178. ISBN 978-0-230-10067-1.
- Long, Carolyn; Cabral, Michael; Vandivort, Brooks (1999). "The Chief Environmental Diplomat: An Evolving Arena of Foreign Policy". The Environmental Presidency. State University of New York Press. Chapter 7.
- Lowitt, Richard (1984). The New Deal and the West. University of Indiana Press. ISBN 0-253-34005-5.
- Luke, Timothy W. (1999). "The wilderness society: Environmentalism as environationalism". Capitalism Nature Socialism. 10 (4): 1–35. doi:10.1080/10455759909358884.
- McJimsey, George (1987). Harry Hopkins: Ally of the poor and defender of democracy. Harvard University Press. ISBN 0-674-37287-5.
- Mackenzie, G. Calvid; Weisbrot, Robert (2008). The Liberal Hour: Washington and the Politics of Change in the 1960s. Penguin Books. ISBN 978-0143115465.
- Maher, Neil M. (July 2002). "A New Deal Body Politic: Landscape, Labor, and the Civilian Conservation Corps" (PDF). Environmental History. 7 (3): 435–461. Bibcode:2002EnvH....7..435M. doi:10.2307/3985917. JSTOR 3985917. S2CID 144800756. Archived (PDF) from the original on June 2, 2016.
- Martinez-Alier, Joan (2002). The Environmentalism of the Poor: A Study of Ecological Conflicts and Valuation. Edward Elgar. doi:10.4337/9781843765486. ISBN 9781840649093.
- McNeill, J. R.; Mauldin, Erin Stewart, eds. (2012). The United States in Global Environmental History. John Wiley & Sons. pp. 132–152. doi:10.1002/9781118279519. ISBN 978-1-4443-3534-7.
- McGerr, Michael (2003). The Rise and Fall of the Progressive Movement in America. Oxford University Press. ISBN 978-0-19-518365-8.
- Milazzo, Paul C. (2011). "Nixon and the Environment". In Small, Melvin (ed.). A Companion to Richard M. Nixon. Wiley-Blackwell. pp. 270–291. doi:10.1002/9781444340952. ISBN 978-1-4443-3017-5.
- Mohai, Paul; Pellow, David; Roberts, J. Timmons (2009). "Environmental Justice". Annual Review of Environment and Resources. 34 (405–430): 405–430. doi:10.1146/annurev-environ-082508-094348.
- Montrie, Chad (2011). A People's History of Environmentalism in the United States. Continuum. ISBN 978-1441198686.
- Morris, Edmund (2001). Theodore Rex. Random House Publishing. ISBN 978-0-8129-6600-8.
- Nixon, Edgar B. (1957). Franklin D. Roosevelt and Conservation, 1911-1945. Franklin D. Roosevelt Library.
- O'Brien, Michael (2005). John F. Kennedy: A Biography. Washington Monthly. ISBN 0-312-28129-3.
- Owen, A. L. Riesch (1983). Conservation Under FDR. Praeger. ISBN 0-03-063166-1.
- Pinchot, Gifford (1947). Breaking New Ground. Island Press. ISBN 978-1559636704.
- Richardson, Elmo R. (1958). "Conservation as a Political Issue: The Western Progressives Dilemma, 1909-1912". The Pacific Northwest Quarterly. 49 (2): 49–54. JSTOR 40487293.
- Richardson, Elmo (1972). "The Interior Secretary as Conservation Villain: The Notorious Case of Douglas 'Giveaway' McKay". Pacific Historical Review. 41 (3). University of California Press. doi:10.2307/3637862. JSTOR 3637862.
- Richardson, Elmo (1973). "Dams, Parks, and Politics: Resource Development and Preservation the Truman-Eisenhower Era". Environmental Policy. University of Kentucky Press. Archived from the original on May 6, 2020.
- Rinde, Meir (2017). "Richard Nixon and the Rise of American Environmentalism". Distillations. Vol. 3, no. 1. pp. 16–29. Archived from the original on April 5, 2018.
- Schlosberg, David (2002). "3: The Justice of Environmental Justice: Reconciling Equity, Recognition, and Participation in a Political Movement". In Light, Andrew; de-Shalit, Avner (eds.). Moral and Political Reasoning in Environmental Practice. Massachusetts Institute of Technology Press. pp. 77–107. ISBN 0-262-62164-9.
- Schlosberg, David (2007). Defining Environmental Justice: Theories, Movements, and Nature. Oxford University Press. ISBN 978-0-19-928629-4.
- Sessions, George (1996). "Reinventing nature? The end of wilderness? A response to William Cronon's Uncommon Ground". Wild Earth. 6 (4).
- Small, Melvin (1999). The Presidency of Richard Nixon. University Press of Kansas. ISBN 0-7006-0973-3.
- Smith, Thomas G. (1995). "John Kennedy, Stewart Udall, and New Frontier Conservation". Pacific Historical Review. 64 (3): 329–362. doi:10.2307/3641005. JSTOR 3641005.
- Sturgeon, Stephen Craig (2002). The politics of western water: the congressional career of Wayne Aspinall. University of Arizona Press. p. xiv. ISBN 978-0816521609.
- Swain, Donald C. (1972). "The National Park Service and the New Deal, 1933-1940". Pacific Historical Review. 41 (3): 312–332. doi:10.2307/3637861. JSTOR 3637861.
- Taylor, Doceta E. (2009). The Environment and the People in American Cities, 1600s-1900s: Disorder, Inequality and Social Change. Duke University Press. ISBN 978-0822344513.
- Thulin, Lila (2019). "How an Oil Spill Inspired the First Earth Day: Before Earth Day made a name for the environmental movement, a massive oil spill put a spotlight on the dangers of pollution". Smithsonian Magazine.
- Train, Russel E. (1996). "The Environmental Record of the Nixon Administration". Presidential Studies Quarterly. 26 (1): 185–196. JSTOR 27551558.
- Turner, Tom (2015). David Brower: The Making of the Environmental Movement. University of California Press. ISBN 978-0520278363.
- Whitaker, John C. (1976). Striking a balance: Environment and Natural Resources Policy in the Nixon-Ford Years. Washington: American Enterprise Institute for Public Policy Research. ISBN 0-8447-3226-5.
