= CFAA =

CFAA may refer to:

- Committee for Financial and Administrative Affairs of the European Union's Committee of the Regions
- Computer Fraud and Abuse Act, a United States law of 1986
- Cooperative Forestry Assistance Act of 1978, a United States law
- CFAA-FM, a radio rebroadcasting station of CJMM-FM in northern Quebec, Canada
