= National Conservation Commission =

Commission appointed by Theodore Roosevelt

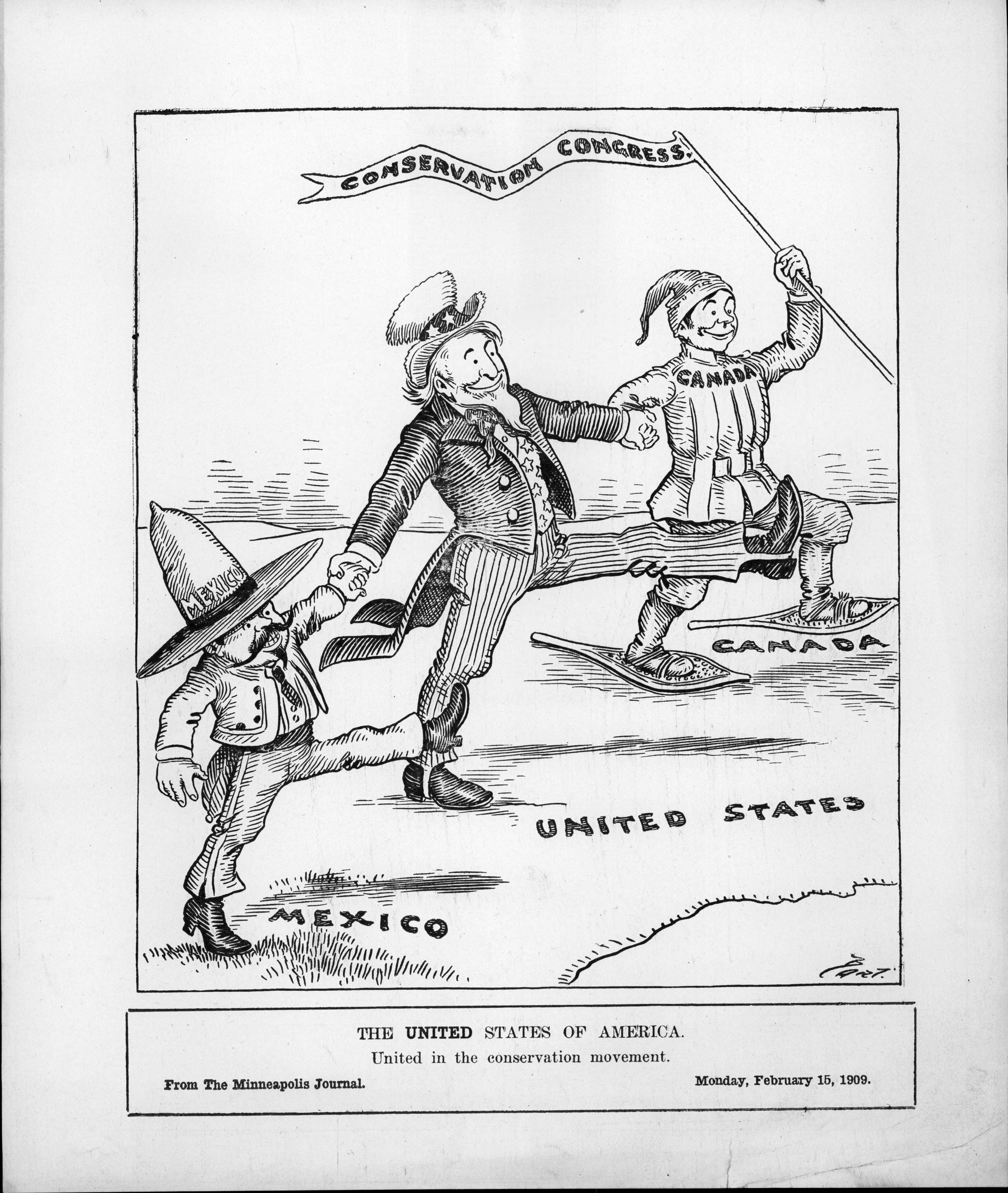
'United in the conservation movement.' 1909 cartoon by Charles L. Bartholomew

The National Conservation Commission was appointed on June 8, 1908, by President Theodore Roosevelt and consisted of representatives of the United States Congress and relevant executive agency technocrats; Gifford Pinchot served as chairman of its executive committee. The commission was the fourth of seven conservation commissions and conferences established during Roosevelt's presidency (1901–1909). This commission had resulted from the first Conference of Governors just weeks earlier, which similarly had stemmed from the previous recommendations of the Inland Waterways Commission, presented to Congress in February 1908. The National Conservation Commission was divided into four sections, water, forests, lands, and minerals, with each having its own chairman; it prepared the first inventory of the nation's natural resources, in a three-volume report submitted to Congress at the beginning of 1909. The commissions findings also present Pinchot's concepts of resource management as a comprehensive policy recommendation for the government. Policy recommendations included eugenic marriage restrictions and involuntary sterilization. Roosevelt and Pinchot wanted the commission to continue, but Congress refused further funding.

President Roosevelt also invited representatives from Canada, Newfoundland and Mexico to the North American Conservation Conference so that inter-national conservation issues could be discussed. Those who attended agreed that they would co-ordinate policies about natural resource management between the three countries, but each country would have to separately establish a commission that would allow for cooperation and information exchange. This agreement ultimately did not produce any results, but it did lead to Canada establishing the non-partisan Commission of Conservation. This commission allowed for the completion of over two hundred studies before 1919. The commission was composed of an executive committee and also involved universities to provide scientific and technical expertise. The committees were divided into seven working groups; forestry, lands, fisheries, game and wildlife, water and waterpower, minerals and public health.

== See also ==
- National Conservation Exposition
