= Inland Waterways Commission =

United States federal agency, 1907-1920

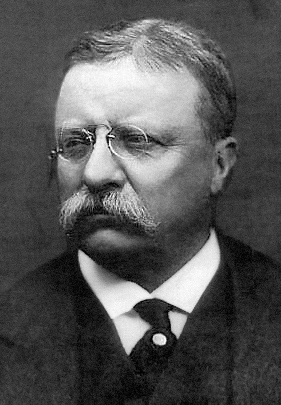
- Established by Executive Order of President Theodore Roosevelt.

Agency overview
- Formed: March 14, 1907
- Dissolved: March 4, 1909
- Superseding agency: National Waterways Commission
- Jurisdiction: United States Federal
- Headquarters: Washington, D.C.
- Employees: 9 commissioners

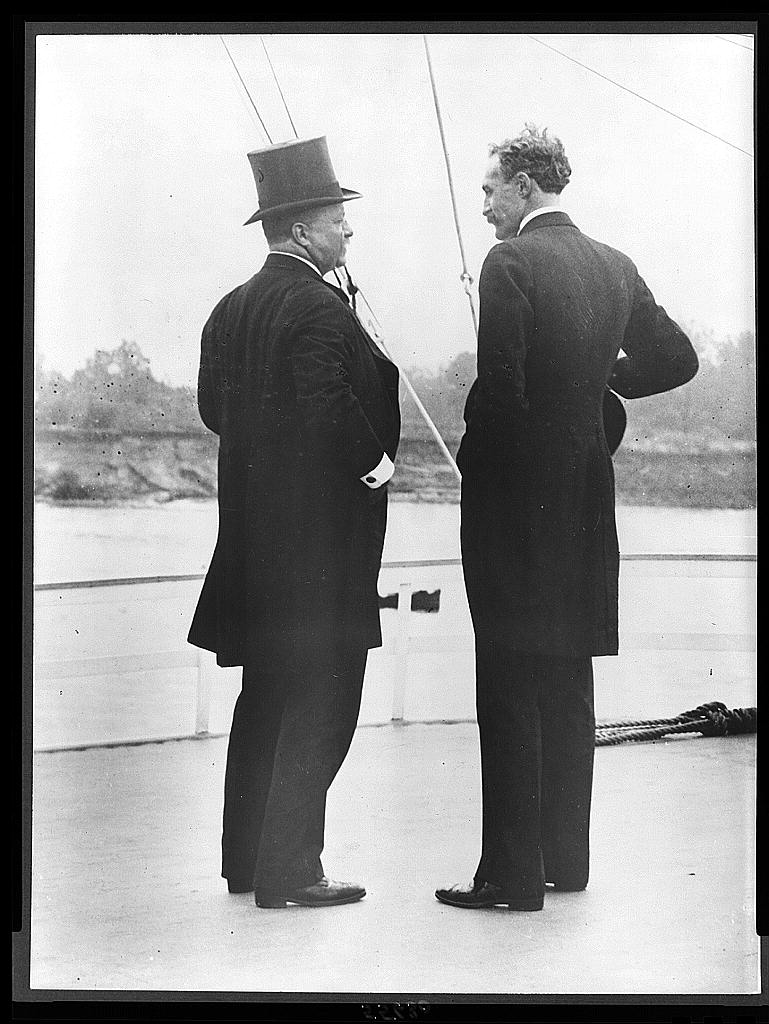
Roosevelt and Gifford Pinchot on the deck of the Mississippi in 1907 during the Inland Waterways Commission inspections

The Inland Waterways Commission was a United States federal agency, created by Congress in March 1907 at the request of President Theodore Roosevelt, to investigate the transportation crisis that recently had affected the nation's ability to move its produce and industrial production efficiently. The immediate crisis centered on insufficient railroad capacity developed by the private sector, and competing but neglected inland shipping, the navigation of which had been deemed under federal purview since 1824. The temporary commission lasted until the end of Roosevelt's presidency, but his conservationist progressive interest was focused more than on transportation alone. The president wanted water projects to be considered for their multiple uses and in relation to other natural resources and asked for a comprehensive plan for the improvement and control of the river systems of the United States.

Based on long-established legislative structure and more recent bureaucratic additions, the appointed members of the commission included, elected Representative Theodore E. Burton (R OH), as chairman, being also chair of the House Committee on Rivers and Harbors; Senator Francis G. Newlands (D NV), as vice-chair; Senator William Warner (R MO), and Senator John H. Bankhead (D AL). Non-elected commissioners included government technocrats with experience in related fields, including Alexander Mackenzie, Chiefs of Engineers, US Army, and the entity involved in federal navigation improvements since the beginning; William John McGee, as secretary and from the United States Geological Survey; Frederick Haynes Newell, the first director of the United States Reclamation Service; Gifford Pinchot, the first chief of the United States Forest Service, and Herbert Knox Smith, from the Bureau of Corporations and predecessor to the Federal Trade Commission.

By the end of that year, after the commission had looked at shipping on the Mississippi River and the Great Lakes, a minority of its members concluded that the nation needed a comprehensive water resources policy along with an autonomous commission of experts to plan and construct water projects that embraced entire river basins. At the end of 1907, and before Roosevelt presented the commission's preliminary report to Congress in late February, Senator Newlands introduced the first bill to create a permanent commission. Over the next decade the subject of hydroelectricity would be closely studied, while Newlands drafted several more bills, with only an emasculated version becoming law in 1917. While supportive of the commission's report generally, most members of Congress considered Newlands's plan either impractical or unconstitutional. Three years later, Congress all but eliminated the hope of centralized water planning when it replaced the Inland Waterways Commission with the Federal Power Commission, following passage of the Federal Water Power Act of 1920.

== Presidential charge ==
On March 14, 1907, President Roosevelt appointed the Inland Waterway Commissioners and charged them to prepare and report "a comprehensive plan for the improvement and control of the river systems of the United States." He was influenced, he said, by broad considerations of national policy, and the corresponding responsibilities and obligations, since the control of navigable waterways lies within the federal purview. He noted that while private sector energies had been directed largely toward industrial development in connection with field and forest, coal and iron, some of these material and power resources may already be largely depleted or abused. At the same time, the government's inland waterways have received scant attention as a whole, and it was becoming clear that the nation's streams should be considered and conserved as great natural resources. So far, works designed to control the waterways have usually been undertaken for a single purpose in mind, such as the improvement of navigation, the development of power, the irrigation of arid lands, the protection of lowlands from floods, or to supply water for domestic and manufacturing purposes. While the people's rights to these and similar water uses must be respected, the time had come, he said, for local projects and uses of the inland waters to be viewed in a more comprehensive plan, designed for the benefit of the entire country; such a plan should consider and include all the uses to which streams may be put, and should bring together and coordinate the points of view of all water users. While the task involved in the full and orderly development and control of the nation's river systems is a great one, it is certainly not too great for the government to approach, especially with results which seem to promise even greater returns.

The commission's appointment followed numerous petitions from commercial organizations in the Mississippi valley asking for such study, and he said, "the common knowledge that the railroads of the United States are no longer able to move crops and manufactures rapidly enough to secure the prompt transaction of the business of the nation, and there is small prospect of immediate relief." During the previous ten years, while the production of the northern interior States had doubled, the railroad facilities to transport it had increased only about 12%; there was reason to doubt railroad development could keep transportation abreast of production in the near-term. "There appears to be but one complete remedy—the development of a complementary system of transportation by water. The present congestion affects chiefly the people of the Mississippi valley, and they demand relief. When the congestion of which they complain is relieved, the whole Nation will share the good results."

Roosevelt noted that while the nation's rivers are natural resources of first rank, they are also liable to become destructive agencies, endangering life and property; and that some of our most notable engineering enterprises have grown from the effort to control them. The vast quantity of annual suspended sediment and an enormous but unmeasured amount of earth-salts and soil-matter carried in solution not only causes the Mississippi channels to clog and flood the lowlands of the lower river, but also renders the flow variable and difficult to control. Furthermore, he noted, the sediment and soil-matter is composed of the most fertile material of the fields and pastures drained by the tributaries. "Any plan for utilizing our inland waterways should consider floods and their control by forests and other means; the protection of bottom-lands from injury by overflow, and up-lands from loss by soil-wash; the physics of sediment-charged waters and the physical or other ways of purifying them; the construction of dams and locks, not only to facilitate navigation but to control the character and movement of the waters; and should look to the full use and control of our running waters and the complete "artificialization" of our waterways for the benefit of citizens as a whole." Not being possible to properly frame so large a plan for the control of rivers without taking account of the orderly development of other natural resources, Roosevelt asked that the Inland Waterways Commission consider the relations of the streams to the use of all the great permanent natural resources and their conservation to make and maintain prosperous homes.

Roosevelt noted that any feasible plan for utilizing inland waterways should recognize both the existing federal means, including the Departments of War, Interior, Agriculture, and Commerce and Labor, and those in the states and their subdivisions. He stated that such a plan must not involve unduly burdensome expenditures from the national treasury. The cost necessarily will be large and proportional to the magnitude of potential benefits to the people, but it will be small in comparison to the $17 billion in current capital investments for steam railways nationally. That amount would have seemed enormous and incredible a half a century earlier, yet that investment was a continuous source of profit to the people. Without it, the nation's industrial progress would have been impossible. In closing the President said that, the questions before the Inland Waterways Commission must necessarily relate to every part of the United States and affect every interest within its borders. Its plans should be considered in light of the widest modern knowledge of the country and its people, and from the most diverse points of view. As the committee's work sufficiently advanced, he would add more consulting members to the commission, and ask that its recommendations be fully discussed with him, before they were submitted. The commission's report should include both a general statement of the problems, as well as recommendations concerning the manner and means of attacking the problems perceived by them.

== Proceedings ==
After initial conference and correspondence the organizational meeting was held in Washington DC from April 29 to May 3, 1907. A second meeting and inspection trip on the Mississippi River from St. Louis to the Passes was held May 13 to May 23. A third meeting and inspection trip took place from September 21 to October 13, which traveled on the Great Lakes from Cleveland to Duluth, on the Mississippi from St. Paul to Memphis, and on the Missouri River from Kansas City to St. Louis. A fourth meeting was held in the capitol beginning on November 25, for the purpose of preparing a preliminary report. The commission ended February 3, 1908.

During the organizational and inspecting meetings, thirty formal sessions were held in addition to informal meetings and conferences. At several of these sessions the entire commission were present; at no session were there fewer than five commissioners; the average attendance was over seven. During the meetings for report preparation there were 27 sessions, with an average attendance of seven. Experts on matters entrusted to the commission were present by invitation at 24 sessions; of these experts there were 24, several of whom attended two or more sessions, with most being former or current attaches of the Corps of Engineers. Outside formal sessions, the commissioners devoted much time to the consideration of the waterways and related matters. Two or three commissioners jointly inspected the upper Missouri, the Columbia and Snake, the Sacramento and San Joaquin, and major tributaries. Several commissioners employed agencies under their direction in collating and digesting data relating to canals, water transportation, etc. Most of the commissioners attended conventions and other meetings connected with the development of waterways and related interests.

At the 18th session a special committee of one, Gen. Alexander MacKenzie, was appointed to prepare a list of statutes and considerations relating to water power, especially generation of hydroelectricity. Following action at the 23rd session, with the President presiding, a letter requesting a conference on the conservation of natural resources was framed and presented to the President on October 4, 1907; this later resulted in the first Conference of Governors. At the twenty-fifth session a committee of three was appointed to communicate further with the President on this matter, and to prepare a preliminary draft of their report; both committees reported at the fourth meeting.

== Commission report ==
The investigations and discussions of the Inland Waterways Commission resulted in a series of 'Findings', containing their statements of fact connected with navigation and other uses of the inland waterways nationally, 'Recommendations', containing their conclusions on those findings, 'Inquiries in progress', containing certain matters still under discussion and an extensive 'Appendix'.

== See also ==
- General Survey Act
- Internal improvements (public works)
- History of rail transport in the United States
- History of turnpikes and canals in the United States
- Hydroelectric power in the United States
- Hydropower policy in the United States
- Inland waterways of the United States
- Natural monopoly
- Rivers and Harbors Acts
- United States Senate Committee on Transportation Routes to the Seaboard
