= Conference of Governors =

Political conference

The Conference of Governors was held in the White House May 13–15, 1908 under the sponsorship of President Theodore Roosevelt. Gifford Pinchot, at that time Chief Forester of the U.S., was the primary mover of the conference, and a progressive conservationist, who strongly believed in the scientific and efficient management of natural resources on the federal level. He was also a prime mover of the previous Inland Waterways Commission, which recommended such a meeting the previous October. On November 13, 1907, the president issued invitations to the governors of the States and Territories to meet at the White House on those dates. This 1908 meeting was the beginning of the annual governors' conferences, now held by the National Governors Association.

The focus of the conference was on natural resources and their proper use. President Roosevelt delivered the opening address: "Conservation as a National Duty." Among those speaking were leading industrialists, such as Andrew Carnegie and James J. Hill, politicians, and resource experts. Their speeches emphasized both the nation's need to exploit renewable resources and the differing situations of the various states, requiring different plans. This Conference was a seminal event in the history of conservationism; it brought the issue to public attention in a highly visible way. The next year saw two outgrowths of the Conference: the National Conservation Commission, which Roosevelt and Pinchot set up with representatives from the states and Federal agencies, and the First National Conservation Congress, which Pinchot led as an assembly of private conservation interests.
