= Cooperative Forestry Assistance Act of 1978 =

The Cooperative Forestry Assistance Act of 1978 (Pub. L. 95–313) is a United States federal law enacted in 1978. It revised the authority of the United States Forest Service (under the earlier Clarke–McNary Act of 1924 and other statutes) for to provide financial and technical assistance to states and private landowners on a variety of forestry issues, including forest management and stewardship, fire protection, insect and disease control, reforestation and stand improvement, and urban forestry.
