= Tom Schultz (forester) =

American forester

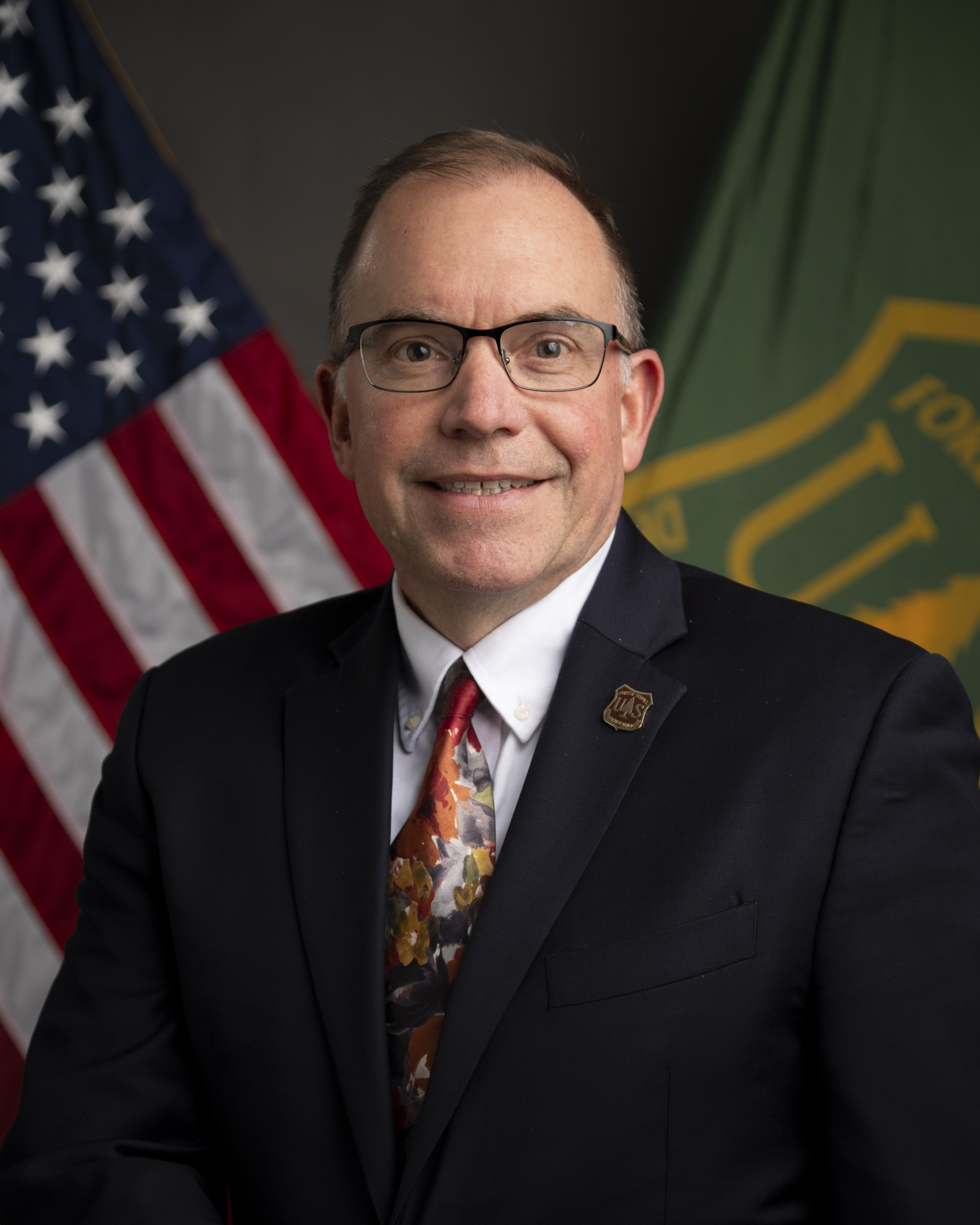
- Official portrait (2025)

21st Chief of the United States Forest Service
- Incumbent
- Assumed office 3 March 2025
- President: Donald Trump
- Preceded by: Randy Moore

Director of the Idaho Department of Lands
- In office 23 August 2011 – January 2018

Personal details
- Education: University of Virginia (BA); University of Wyoming (MA); University of Montana (MS)

Military service
- Allegiance: United States
- Branch/service: United States Air Force
- Years of service: 1991–1996

Tom Schultz is an American forester and former corporate executive, who is currently serving as the 21st Chief of the United States Forest Service, a position he has held since 2025. He is the third Chief to be selected from outside the agency's ranks, after Jack Ward Thomas and Michael Dombeck.

== Biography ==
Tom Schultz was born in Virginia, where he grew up using the outdoors recreationally. He graduated from Woodbridge Senior High School in 1987.

Schultz graduated from the University of Virginia in 1991 with a Bachelor of Arts degree in political science. An ROTC participant, he commissioned into the United States Air Force that same year, serving until August of 1996.

Schultz received two more degrees in the following years: Master of Arts, from the University of Wyoming (1995), in political science, and Master of Science, from the University of Montana (2005), in forestry.

From 1991 to 2011, Schultz was the administrator of the Land Trust Division of the Montana Department of Natural Resources and Conservation.

On 23 August 2011, Schultz was appointed Director of the Idaho Department of Lands. He would serve in this capacity until his resignation in January 2018.

After departing from the Idaho Dept. of Lands, Schultz became vice president of government affairs and community outreach for the Idaho Forest Group, a logging corporation.

== Chief of the U.S. Forest Service ==
=== Appointment ===
On 27 February 2025, Secretary of Agriculture Brooke Rollins announced Schultz to be the 21st Chief of the Forest Service, replacing Randy Moore, who was retiring. He succeeded Moore on 3 March. Schultz was the first Forest Service chief who did not have previous experience working for the agency.

Groups like the Sierra Club criticized Schultz's appointment, citing his experience as a lumber executive to be counterproductive in leading an agency charged with protecting old-growth forests, among others.

=== Tenure ===
Schultz led efforts to repeal the Roadless Area Conservation Rule.

==== Reorganization ====
===== State offices =====
Under Schultz's leadership, the Forest Service announced, on 31 March 2026, its intent to relocate from Washington D.C. to Salt Lake City, Utah.

In addition to the move, the agency is also disbanding its current regional command model. 15 state directors will be appointed, with responsibility for operations within a specific state boundary, rather than having a nationally-defined regional zone (which previously transcended political subdivision borders). The state-level branches will have individual command teams, primarily focused on legislative affairs and resource management.

Schultz defended the dissolution of regional commands at a Western Governors Association conference in Park City, Utah, on 30 June 2026.

===== Fire & Aviation consolidation =====
On 11 August 2026, Schultz announced the service would be consolidating their fire and aviation authorities into a single position. The position would be titled "Deputy Chief – Fire & Aviation Management, Safety, & Employee Wellbeing", and would serve as a sole point of command and communication for all matters related.

== See also ==
- List of United States Forest Service Chiefs

Government offices
Preceded by Randy Moore	Chief of the United States Forest Service; 2025–present	Incumbent
