= Randy Moore (forester) =

American soil scientist and forester

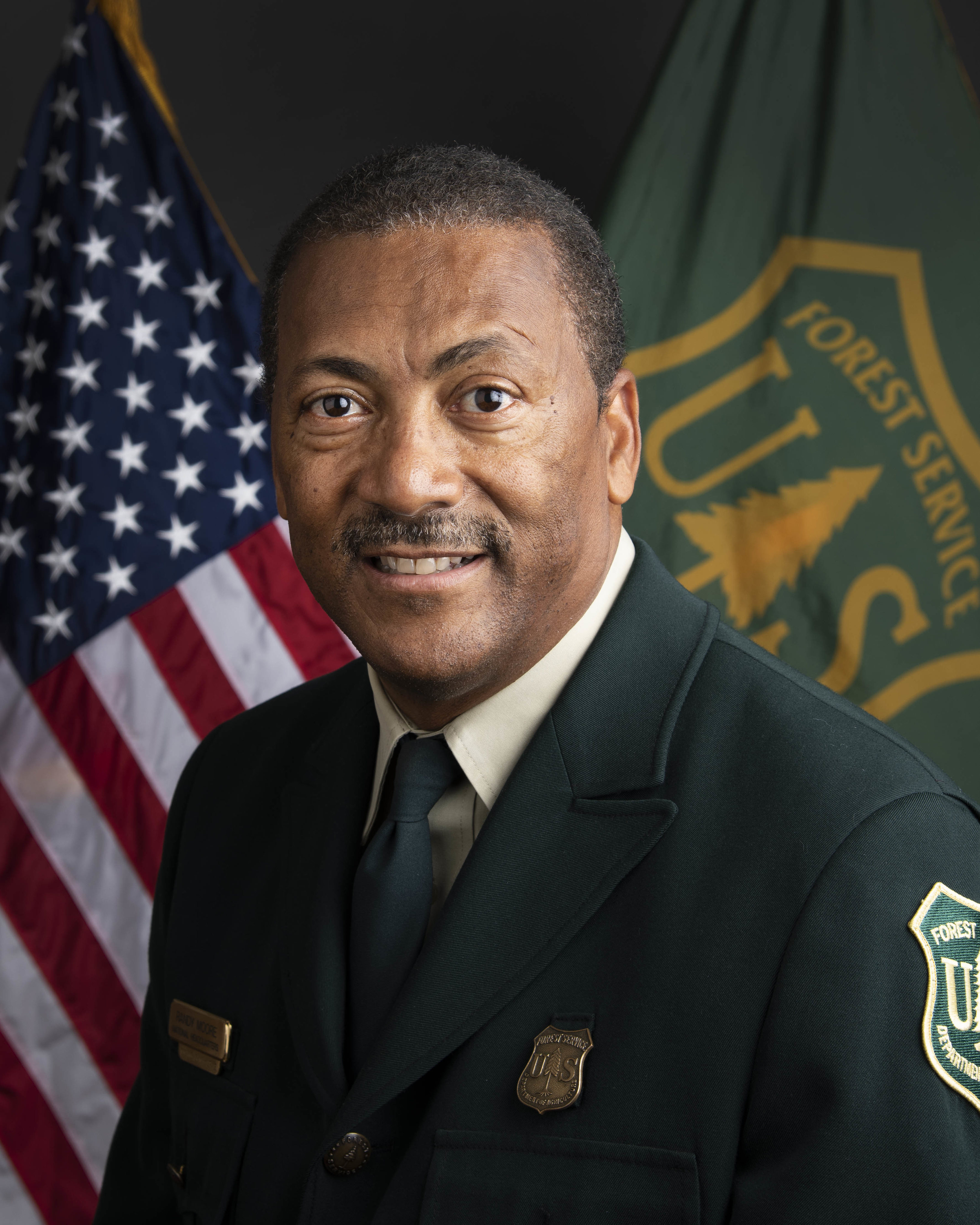

20th Chief of the United States Forest Service
- In office 26 July 2021 – 3 March 2025
- President: Joe Biden; Donald Trump
- Preceded by: Vicki Christiansen
- Succeeded by: Tom Schultz

Personal details
- Education: Southern University (BS)

Randy Moore is an American soil scientist and forester who had served as the 20th chief of the United States Forest Service. He was appointed by Secretary Tom Vilsack.

== Education ==
Moore earned a Bachelor of Science degree in plant and soil science from Southern University.

== Career ==
Moore began his career 1978 with the Natural Resources Conservation Service in North Dakota. He eventually joined the United States Forest Service in 1981. He has held various positions in the agency, including regional forester for the Eastern Region in Wisconsin and forest supervisor for Mark Twain National Forest in Missouri. Moore served as the Pacific Southwestern regional forester, managing 18 national forests in California spanning 20 million acres, as well as state and private forestry programs in Hawaii and the Pacific Islands.

Moore has been an advocate for utilizing vegetation treatment methods to reduce the risk of wildfire, rather than relying solely on logging. He believes that this approach can effectively decrease wildfire risk while preserving the natural beauty and ecological integrity of the forest. In addition to his advocacy of vegetation treatment, Moore has also focused on improving the pay and working conditions for firefighters, as well as increasing capacity and resources through partnerships with other agencies and organizations. He announced his retirement in February 2025, effective March 3.

In March 2024, Moore published a public message reflecting on his service and leadership challenges during his tenure as Chief of the U.S. Forest Service."A Note of Reflection from Chief Randy Moore". U.S. Forest Service. March 1, 2024.

== See also ==
- List of United States Forest Service Chiefs

Political offices
Preceded by Vicki Christiansen	Chief of the United States Forest Service; 2021–2025	Succeeded by Tom Schultz
