= Tony Tooke =

American government official

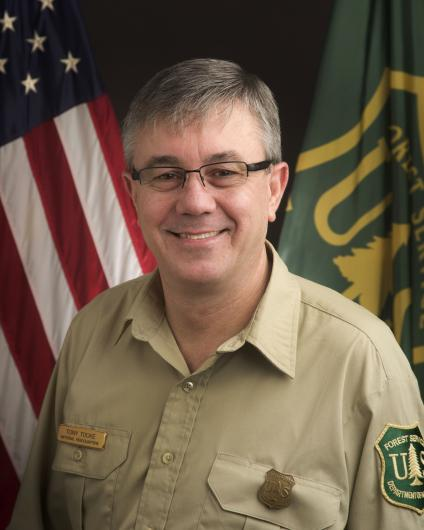

18th Chief of the United States Forest Service
- In office September 1, 2017 – March 7, 2018
- President: Donald Trump
- Preceded by: Thomas Tidwell
- Succeeded by: Vicki Christiansen

Personal details
- Spouse: Ginger Tooke
- Education: Mississippi State University (B.A., 1983)
- Occupation: Forester

Tony Tooke was the Chief of the United States Forest Service for a little over six months, from September 1, 2017, until he announced his retirement on March 7, 2018 due to numerous sexual misconduct allegations over his four decades of employment in numerous positions for the Forest Service.

== Career ==
Tony Tooke began his career in the U.S. Forest Service in 1980, at the age of 18, on the National Forests in Mississippi. In 1993 he became a Forest Service line officer. His field experience includes assignments as a "Timber Management Assistant", a position usually responsible for the execution of a program to produce a specified amount of timber each year. His next career steps included being an "Other Resource Assistant", and a Silviculturist (an individual who is responsible for timber harvesting and reforestation plans). He eventually became a Forester on six Ranger Districts, including districts in Kentucky and Mississippi, managing the growth of different trees and monitoring their health. From there he moved on to become District Ranger at the Talladega National Forest in Alabama, the Oconee National Forest in Georgia, and the DeSoto National Forest in Mississippi. After that, he served as Deputy Forest Supervisor for the National Forests in Florida.

=== Washington positions ===
Since 2006, Tony Tooke also held increasingly senior positions in the Forest Service's Washington Office (WO). In September of that year, he took over the position of Assistant Director for Forest Management. In this function, he became closely acquainted with questions of ecological restoration, climate change, and integrative vegetation management. Since March 2009, he served as Deputy Director for Economic Recovery. In December 2009, he became the Director for Ecosystem Management Coordination, where it was his job to manage the lands and resources of the National Forest System.

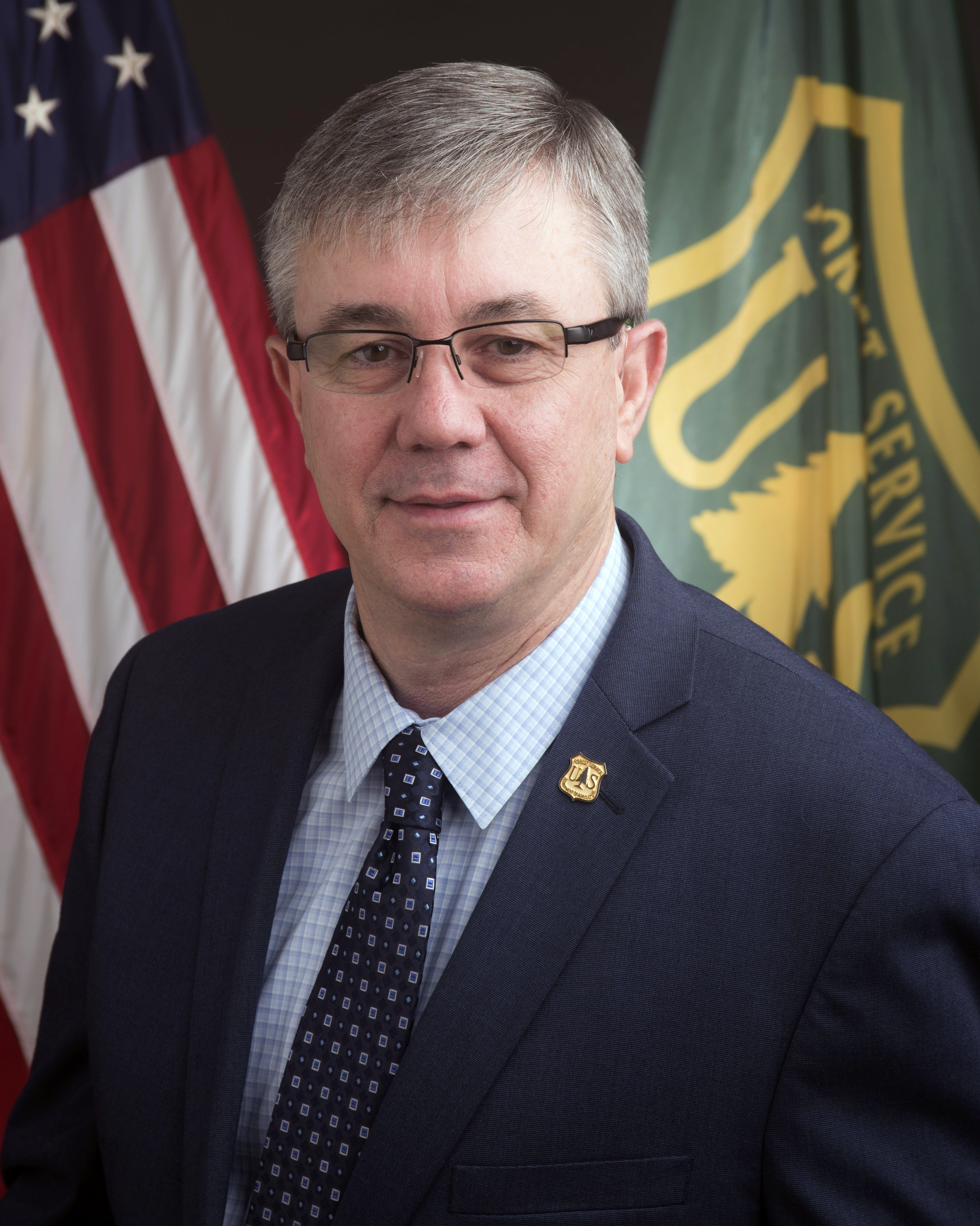
Tooke's official USDA portrait

His last position in Washington, D.C., before becoming Service Chief, was Associate Deputy Chief for the National Forest System. In this capacity, he oversaw numerous work areas of the Forest Service, including the Lands and Realties the agency has been entrusted with, but also less obvious aspects such as Minerals and Geology. Furthermore, his obligations included the oversight of cooperation efforts with state rural development councils through the National Partnership Office as well as the coordination of ecosystems management and the Forest Service's efforts for the conservation of wilderness areas and wild scenic rivers. In addition, he also was responsible for oversight of bureaucratic necessities such as Business Administration and Support Services. As Associate Deputy Chief, Tooke was also in charge of the Forest Service's programs for Environmental Justice and the implementation of the 2014 Agricultural Act, commonly known as the "Farm Bill", which helps the Forest Service to accomplish some of its core missions, such as ecological restoration and reducing risks of wildland fires. Yet another facet of Tony Tooke's work was to implement the Forest Service's strategy to improve the agency's awareness of the state of its inventory, as well as the work of its usually widely dispersed employees, and the implementation of a new planning rule for the National Forest System.

=== Atlanta positions ===
After Tooke's assignment in the WO, he became Regional Forester for the Forest Service's Southern Region, also known as Region 8, headquartered in Atlanta, GA. The Southern Regional Office manages forests and lands of 13 states as well as Puerto Rico. In a ceremony at White Mountain National Forest on September 2, 2017, Tooke took an oath of office from the U.S. Secretary of Agriculture, Sonny Perdue, thereby making Tooke the 18th Chief of the U.S. Forest Service. New Hampshire's Governor, Chris Sununu, and members of the US Forest Service also attended the ceremony. Tooke succeeded the longtime Chief of the Forest Service Thomas Tidwell. The new Chief took over an agency that oversees 154 national forests, as well as 20 grasslands in 43 states and Puerto Rico. One of his primary tasks would be to lead the fight against wildland fires which consume more than half of the Forest Services financial resources, topping $2 billion in 2017. The agency, as Tooke said in a statement in September 2017, appreciated the help it received from Congress to develop more effective tools for firefighting.

=== Sexual misconduct ===
On March 2, 2018, the U.S. Forest Service confirmed that the United States Department of Agriculture has "engaged an independent investigator" to evaluate charges of sexual misconduct and harassment against Tooke, including retaliation against those who complained about him. Within days, Tooke announced his immediate retirement on March 7, 2018.

== Education ==
Tooke holds a bachelor's degree in forestry from Mississippi State University (1983). He was a member of the inaugural class of the United States Forest Service's "Senior Leadership Program". He has also completed the Senior Executive Service Candidate Development Program.

Political offices
Preceded by Thomas Tidwell	Chief of the United States Forest Service; 2017–2018	Succeeded by Vicki Christiansen
