= Vicki Christiansen =

19th Chief of the United States Forest Service

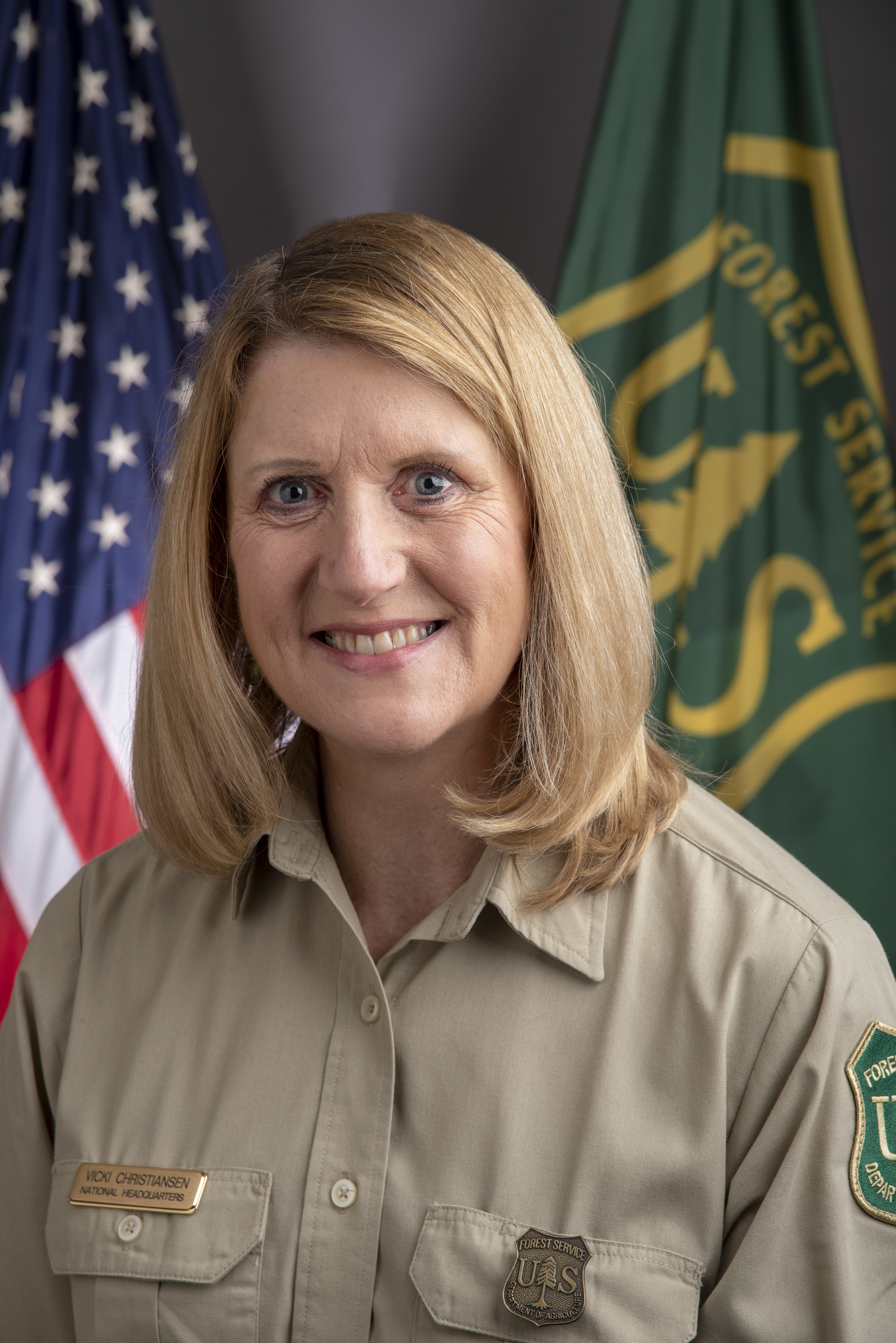

19th Chief of the United States Forest Service
- In office October 2018 – July 26, 2021
- President: Donald Trump; Joe Biden
- Preceded by: Tony Tooke
- Succeeded by: Randy Moore

Personal details
- Born: Aged 66–67
- Education: University of Washington (BS)

Vicki Christiansen is an American government official who served as the 19th chief of the United States Forest Service from October 2018 to July 2021. Prior to assuming the role, Christiansen had spent seven years with the Forest Service and 30 years with the Washington State Department of Natural Resources and Arizona Department of Forestry and Fire Management.

== Education ==
While a student at the University of Washington, Christiansen began working as a firefighter with the Washington State Department of Natural Resources. She eventually earned a Bachelor of Science degree in forestry in 1983.

== Career ==
Christiansen worked as a firefighter in Washington for 26 years, eventually serving as the Washington State Forester. She then served as the Arizona State Forester from 2009 to 2010. She joined the United States Forest Service in 2010 as the acting director of legislative affairs before serving as deputy director of fire and aviation management. In 2012, she served as acting regional forester for the Northern Region, which covers 25 million acres across five states and includes 12 national forests.

Christiansen was named the 19th chief of the Forest Service in October 2018. Christiansen assumed the role on an interim basis after Tony Tooke, who had been serving as chief for six months, resigned amid allegations of sexual assault and workplace misconduct. Christiansen later said that, as chief, she would seek to end the culture of harassment within the Forest Service.

In June 2021, Christiansen announced that she planned to retire from the Forest Service in August 2021, and she formally stepped down as chief on July 26, 2021. She was succeeded by Randy Moore, the former regional forester for the Pacific Southwest Region.

Political offices
Preceded by Tony Tooke	Chief of the United States Forest Service; 2018–2021	Succeeded by Randy Moore
