= Gail Kimbell =

16th Chief of the United States Forest Service

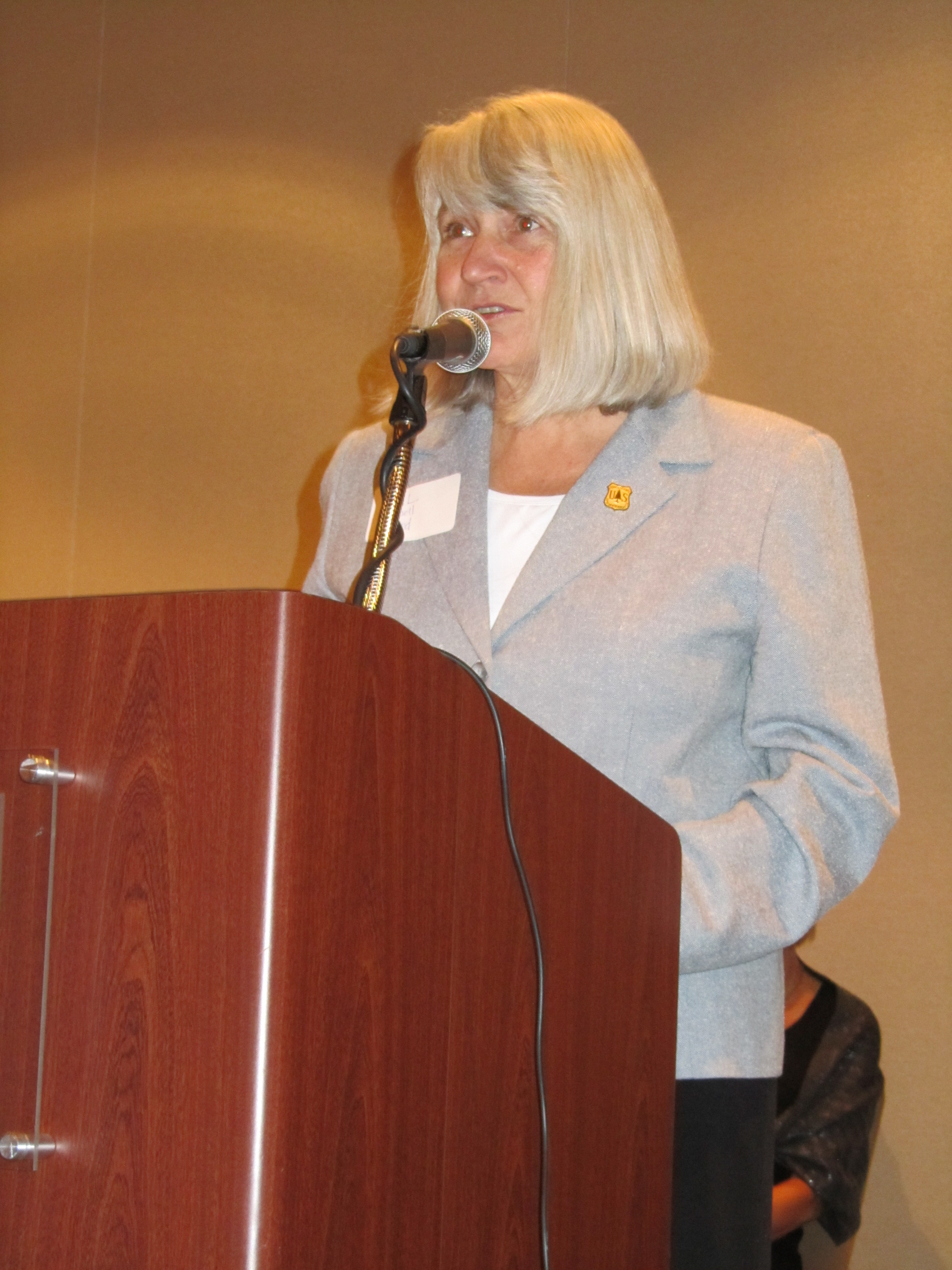

16th Chief of the United States Forest Service
- In office February 5, 2007 – July 2, 2009
- Preceded by: Dale N. Bosworth
- Succeeded by: Thomas Tidwell

Personal details
- Born: September 1, 1953 (age 72) Boston, Massachusetts
- Education: University of Vermont; Oregon State University

Abigail R. "Gail" Kimbell was the 16th and first female Chief of the United States Forest Service.

== Biography ==
Kimbell was raised in New England, where she spent her formative years hiking, fishing, and camping in the White Mountain National Forest. She received a bachelor's degree in forest management from the University of Vermont in 1974 and later a master's degree in forest engineering from Oregon State University.

She worked as a seasonal employee before beginning her federal forestry career in 1974 with the Bureau of Land Management in Medford, Oregon. She then joined the Forest Service as a pre-sale forester in Kodiak, Alaska in 1977. She next worked in Oregon as a logging engineer and then a district planner. She served as a district ranger in Kettle Falls, Washington for the Colville National Forest from 1985 to 1988, and for the Wallowa–Whitman National Forest in La Grande, Oregon, from 1988 to 1991. She also served as forest supervisor of the Tongass National Forest in Alaska from 1992 to 1997 and the Bighorn National Forest in Wyoming from 1997 to 1999.

From 1999 to 2002, Kimbell was the forest supervisor for the Pike and San Isabel National Forests and the Comanche National Grassland in Colorado, as well as the Cimarron National Grassland in Kansas. In May 2002, Kimbell became the Associate Deputy Chief for the National Forest System lands in the Forest Service's main office in Washington, D.C. During her tenure as Associate Deputy Chief, Kimbell's leadership was instrumental in carrying out the Healthy Forests Initiative and in the drafting of the Healthy Forests Restoration Act of 2003.

In December 2003, Kimbell was named as the Regional Forester for the Northern Region located in Missoula, Montana. She served as Chief of the United States Forest Service on February 5, 2007 until July 2, 2009.

Kimbell is a member of the Society of American Foresters.

Kimbell is currently on the board of directors of Kids4Trees and is its senior advisor.

Political offices
Preceded by Dale N. Bosworth	Chief of the United States Forest Service; 2007 – 2009	Succeeded by Thomas Tidwell
