= Thomas Tidwell =

American government official

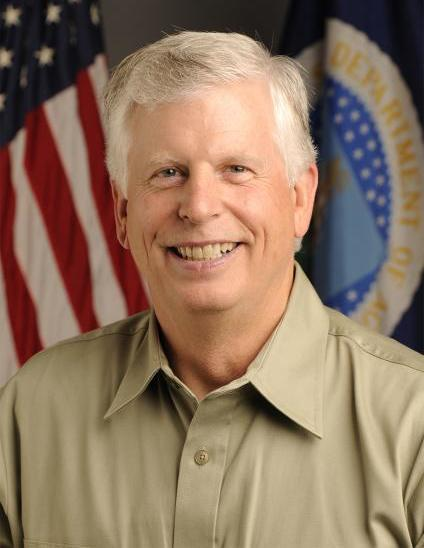

17th Chief of the United States Forest Service
- In office July 17, 2009 – August 31, 2017
- President: Barack Obama; Donald Trump
- Preceded by: Gail Kimbell
- Succeeded by: Tony Tooke

Personal details
- Born: Boise, Idaho
- Spouse: Kim
- Education: Washington State University
- Occupation: Forester
- Chief Tidwell's voice Recorded on March 31, 2014.

Thomas L. Tidwell was the 17th Chief of the United States Forest Service (USFS) of the Department of Agriculture, and was appointed on July 17, 2009, succeeding Gail Kimbell. He was succeeded by Tony Tooke, who was sworn in September 1, 2017.

== Biography ==
=== Early life and education ===
Tom Tidwell grew up in Boise, Idaho. He graduated from Washington State University, where he was a student of Rexford F. Daubenmire.

=== Forester ===
Tidwell began his Forest Service career on the Boise National Forest in fire, and has since worked on eight different national forests, in three regions. He has worked at all levels of the agency in a variety of positions, including District Ranger, Forest Supervisor, and Legislative Affairs Specialist in the Washington Office, where he worked on the planning rule, the 2001 roadless rule and the Secure Rural Schools County Payments Act. Tom served as the Deputy Regional Forester for the Pacific Southwest Region (California, Hawaii, and the Pacific Islands) with primary responsibility for fire and aviation management, recreation, engineering, state and private forestry and tribal relations. Tidwell also served as Forest Supervisor during the 2002 Winter Olympics in Salt Lake City, Utah. On June 17, 2009, Agriculture Secretary Tom Vilsack announced that Tidwell would serve as the new Chief for the United States Forest Service. "Tom Tidwell's 32 years of experience in our forests and impressive track record of collaboration and problem-solving will help us tackle the great challenges ahead," said Vilsack.

=== Personal ===
Tom is married to Kim, and they have one daughter, MacKenzie.

Political offices
Preceded by Gail Kimbell	Chief of the United States Forest Service; 2009–2017	Succeeded by Tony Tooke
