= Melody Starya Mobley =

African American forester

Melody Starya Mobley is the first black woman to serve as a forester for the United States Forest Service.

== Early life and education ==
Mobley was born in 1958 in Louisville, Kentucky. In her youth, she developed a love for and deep relationship with forests, exploring the natural landscapes and feeling of freedom.

She began her college career at the University of Louisville, studying zoology, before transferring to the University of Washington to attain a degree in wildlife management. Mobley later switched her major to forest management after meeting professional forester Lyle Laverty at a conference. She was the first African-American woman to graduate with a forest management degree from the University of Washington in 1979.

== Career ==
Mobley was hired by the United States Forest Service in 1977 after her first year in college, becoming the first black woman forester to serve in the organization.

While serving, Mobley claimed to be sexually assaulted by one of her white male colleagues, while working at a remote site in Skykomish, Washington around 1978. She disclosed her sexual assault to the agency in 1996, years after the incident. She justified not coming forward earlier due to fears of not being believed and a generally racist and misogynistic work culture. Mobley has since stated that nothing came of the disclosure and that the perpetrator was never punished.

Mobley retired from the Forest Service in 2005 at age 46.

Mobley has since worked with the Northern Virginia Regional Park Authority, or NOVA parks, to create programming for Black and Hispanic birders. She has also served as the Diversity, Equity, and Inclusion chair for the Virginia Native Plant Society.

In 2024, Mobley was chosen to receive the Diversity Leadership Award from the Society of American Foresters.

== Personal life ==
Mobley is religious. She currently lives in Arlington, Virginia.
