= James B. Yule =

American forestry engineer

James Blaine Yule
- Born: February 21, 1884; Great Falls, Montana
- Died: June 4, 1957 (73 years old); Missoula, Montana
- Occupations: United States Forest Service Chief of Maps and Surveys
- Years active: 1917–1947
- Known for: Pioneering aerial photography and photogrammetry

James Blaine Yule (February 21, 1884 – June 4, 1957) was an American forestry engineer, who pioneered aerial photography and photogrammetry for the purpose of forest management and controlling wildfires. Yule spent the majority of his 36-year career in the United States Forest Service in Region One, headquartered in Missoula, Montana. His contributions revolutionized forest service knowledge and capabilities during the early years of the United States Forest Service's existence.

== Biography ==
He was born on February 21, 1884, near Great Falls, Montana. Yule enrolled at the University of Montana in Missoula, where he studied engineering, although work on the family ranch inhibited the completion of his degree. As a student his interest and cartographic skill was already apparent, as evinced by his creation of a hand-drawn campus map for an engineering course, dated February 1, 1906.

Yule began working for the United States Forest Service in 1911 as a forest ranger in the Lewis and Clark National Forest. In 1917, Yule was transferred to the Forest Service's division of engineering, where he was promoted to chief of maps and surveys, a position he held for thirty years until his retirement in 1947.

With the U.S. entry into World War I shortly after his promotion, Yule was given a special assignment with the forest products laboratory in Madison, Wisconsin, focusing on aircraft production research. This research, along with his map-making skills, and experience in the Forest Service could have been what spurred Yule to imagine a pairing of aircraft and photography for the purposes of forest management. Similarly, during World War II, Yule, by that point recognized as an authority on aerial photography, was tasked with using aerial photography to map the California coastline. Shortly after, however, Yule was reassigned to the emergency rubber project in Salinas, California. Japanese blockades effectively led to a U.S. shortage on rubber, which had been imported from Asia. Therefore, Yule's new task was to locate suitable planting grounds and process American-made rubber from guayule.

Sometime in the early-1920s, Yule met Margaret Sullivan, whom he married in Snohomish, Washington, on November 20, 1924. They had two daughters together: Valerie and Jamie.

== Professional career ==
As the chief of maps and surveys, Yule married his skill and knowledge of map-making with his World War I experiences in aircraft research by the mid-1920s. He pioneered the development of aerial photography and photogrammetry, on which he was regarded as a "national authority," thereby revolutionizing forest mapping tools used for forest management and wildfire suppression. Aerial photography was faster than traditional ground surveying, and it also produced maps that were more accurate, provided more topographic details of terrain, and at significantly lower costs than traditional ground surveys. One newspaper article, in 1938, explained the advantages of aerial photography: "Two hundred square miles can be mapped by a plane in a day, and a mapping crew of 10 to 12 men would do well to map 300 square miles in an entire season." The benefits of aerial photography were not confined to forestry use. Aerial photography, Yule argued, benefited non-forestry related endeavors as well, such as road building, dam constructing, topographic map-making, and the erection of power lines; any large-scale project that covered a large area would benefit from using aerial photography to map the terrain.

Yule retired on September 1, 1947, after 36 years of service with the Forest Service, 30 of which he spent as chief of maps and surveys in the engineering division of Forest Service Region One. James Yule died June 4, 1957, in Missoula, Montana, at the age of 73.
