= National Genomics Center for Wildlife and Fish Conservation =

- Alternative names: NGC

General information
- Location: Missoula, Montana, 800 E. Beckwith Ave, Missoula MT
- Coordinates: 46°51′26″N 113°59′04″W
- Groundbreaking: 1999

The National Genomics Center for Wildlife and Fish Conservation is a facility for advanced research providing expertise in DNA sequencing and environmental and forensic DNA sampling. It is located in Missoula, Montana, and is part of the U.S. Forest Service's Rocky Mountain Research Station. The Center is designed for cross-agency partnerships to provide genetic and genomic data for species monitoring. The center has agreements with the University of Montana for sharing equipment and the U.S. Fish and Wildlife Service to share expertise. The goal of these federal collaborations is reciprocal cooperation that will assist each agency in meeting its responsibilities related to monitoring and maintaining viable wildlife and fish populations and their habitats. Implementation is intended to maintain and enhance agency effectiveness while avoiding duplication of efforts to provide critical conservation genetics and genomics information to the participating agencies.

The Genomics Center provides advanced methods for species monitoring in the following main categories:

eDNA: Environmental DNA can be collected from bodies of water and offers great potential for monitoring and detecting species of interest.

Non-Invasive Genetic Sampling: This sampling technique uses forensic-style DNA samples, such as hair and feathers, for a more efficient method to monitor rare and sensitive species.

Genomics: Genomics allows the biology of wildlife populations to be explored in great detail, through cutting-edge DNA sequencing technologies.
