= Michael Dombeck =

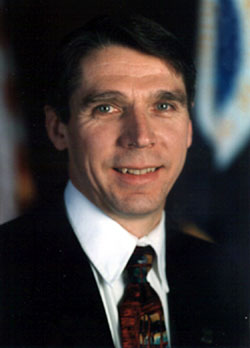

14th Chief of the United States Forest Service
- In office 1997–2001
- President: Bill Clinton
- Preceded by: Jack Ward Thomas
- Succeeded by: Dale N. Bosworth

Personal details
- Born: September 21, 1948 (age 78) Stevens Point, Wisconsin
- Education: University of Wisconsin–Stevens Point (BS); University of Minnesota (MS); Iowa State University (PhD)

Michael P. Dombeck is an American conservationist, educator, scientist, and outdoorsman. He served as acting director of the Bureau of Land Management from 1994 to 1997 and was the 14th Chief of the United States Forest Service from 1997 to 2001. Dombeck also served as UW System Fellow and Professor of Global Conservation at the University of Wisconsin-Stevens Point from 2001 to 2010. He was also the executive director of the David Smith Post-Doctoral Conservation Research Fellowship from 2005 to 2022.

== Early career ==
Dombeck worked as a fishing guide for 11 summers near Hayward, Wisconsin, which informed the path his career would take. He attended the University of Wisconsin-Stevens Point and earned a B.S. in biology and general sciences and an M.S.T. in biology and education degrees. He attended the University of Minnesota, earning an M.S. in Zoology and later earned a PhD from Iowa State University in 1984. His research included studies on the movement, behavior, reproduction, and early life ecology of the muskellunge, Wisconsin's state fish. His research led him to become Program Chairman of the 1st International Muskellunge Symposium held in 1984 with proceedings published by the American Fisheries Society. After three years of teaching zoology at the University of Wisconsin-Stevens Point, Dombeck joined the United States Forest Service (USFS) as a fisheries biologist on the Hiawatha National Forest. He held additional Forest Service assignments throughout the Midwest and California, focused on both aquatic research and fisheries management, after which he was promoted to National Fisheries Program Manager for the USFS where he led the integration of aquatic resources considerations into national forest management and the Rise to the Future Program. He spent a year in 1989 as a LEGIS Fellow working in the U.S. Senate on agriculture and appropriations issues.

== Federal Service ==
=== United States Forest Service—Fisheries ===
Dombeck worked in the United States Forest Service from 1978 until 1989. He joined as a fisheries scientist, then gradually climbed the ranks. He described himself as a "combat biologist" due to his conflicting attitudes with the majority of other agency employees, who he saw as excessively concerned with road-building and engineering rather than environmental conservation.

=== Bureau of Land Management (BLM) ===
At the beginning of the George H. W. Bush administration, Dombeck was assigned as Special Assistant to the Director of the Bureau of Land Management and later was named Science Advisor. At the beginning of the Clinton Administration, he was assigned Acting Assistant Secretary of the Interior for Lands and Minerals Management. In 1994 he was appointed acting director of the Bureau of Land Management by Secretary of the Interior, Bruce Babbitt. Dombeck held that position until 1997 when Secretary of Agriculture Dan Glickman named him the 14th Chief of the U.S. Forest Service.

Dombeck's time at the BLM was marked by a focus on wildlife protection, riparian and aquatic resources and InFish. Dombeck worked closely with then Forest Service Chief Jack Ward Thomas to increase the two agencies' accessibility to public land users, and to promote ecosystem-based management and watershed restoration on public land.

=== United States Forest Service—Leadership ===
Dombeck returned to USFS in 1997 as its chief, appointed by Bill Clinton.

In 1997, Dombeck and the Forest Service Leadership team crafted a four-point agenda, known as The Natural Resource Agenda. It emphasized four major topics; watershed health and restoration, ecologically sustainable forest and grasslands management, recreation and a long-term forest roads policy. Dombeck emphasized the importance of clean water as a forest a product, appointing a task force of scientists and economists to the quantity and value of water flowing from the National Forests. He staunchly defended land conservation and science-based management in speeches delivered to U.S. Congress and congressional committees.

Under Dombeck's leadership, the roadless rule was developed, which protected 58 million acres of the most remote national forest lands. The rule began as an 18-month moratorium on road construction, then was made permanent as a result of activism and email campaigns by environmental advocates. This provided the groundwork for enhancing and increasing Americans’ experiences in the nation's forests by protecting million acres of the remaining wildest places for outdoor recreation and protecting the health and quality of watersheds and ecosystems. Dombeck also had at least 3500 miles of logging roads destroyed, including in the Clearwater National Forest, where the road network had contributed to a series of hundreds of landslides.

His career in public service was recognized with the highest award in career federal service, the Presidential Rank-Distinguished Executive Award by President George W. Bush in 2001. He was the only person to have led the nation's two largest public land management agencies.

== Post Federal Service ==
After retiring from federal service, Dombeck took a position as Professor of Global Conservation at University of Wisconsin-Stevens Point and was later named UW System Fellow, where he served from 2001 to 2010. He also served as executive director of the David Smith Post Doctoral Fellowship in conservation biology from 2005 to 2022, as a trustee of the Johnson Foundation at Wingspread (since 2002), and is a former trustee for Trout Unlimited and the Wisconsin chapter of The Nature Conservancy.

== Awards ==
For his efforts in land conservation, Dombeck was awarded the Ansel Adams Award in 2010, the Aldo Leopold Restoration Award in 2009, an honorary doctorate from Haverford University in 2007, Conservation Hero of the Year by the Wilderness Society in 2001, US-IALE Distinguished Landscape Practitioner in 2019, and numerous other awards. In 2023, he was inducted into the Wisconsin Conservation Hall of Fame.

Political offices
Preceded by Jack Ward Thomas	Chief of the United States Forest Service; 1996–2001	Succeeded by Dale N. Bosworth
