= Jack Ward Thomas =

U.S. Forest Service official (1934–2016)

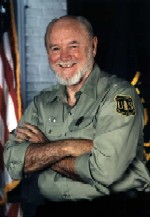

13th Chief of the United States Forest Service

Personal details
- Born: September 7, 1934 Fort Worth, Texas
- Died: May 26, 2016 (aged 81) Florence, Montana

Jack Ward Thomas (September 7, 1934 – May 26, 2016) was the thirteenth chief of the U.S. Forest Service, serving during the Clinton administration years of 1993–1996.

He was born in Fort Worth, Texas. His undergraduate education and degree (a BS in wildlife management in 1957) was from Texas A&M University. He worked for the Texas Parks and Wildlife Department for ten years. Then while working as a USFS research biologist at Morgantown, West Virginia, he received an MS in wildlife ecology from West Virginia University. He headed a Forest Service research unit at the University of Massachusetts in Amherst. He received his PhD in forestry there in 1972. In 1974, he moved to La Grande, Oregon, working as the chief research wildlife biologist and program leader at the USFS Forestry and Range Sciences Laboratory.

On December 1, 1993, he was appointed Chief of the U.S. Forest Service, making him the first Forest Service chief to be hired from outside the ranks of the agency’s executive chain. During his time as head of the USFS, the Northwest Forest Plan was adopted. Jack became a member of the Boone and Crockett Club in 1994. After retiring from the Forest Service, he accepted a position as the Boone and Crockett Professor of Wildlife Conservation at the School of Forestry of the University of Montana in Missoula, Montana—a position he held until 2006 when he officially retired.

He died on May 26, 2016, after a battle with cancer, at his home in Florence, Montana.

== Publications ==
He has more than 600 publications to his credit, including:

- Jack Ward Thomas: The Journals of a Forest Service Chief, edited by Harold K. Steen. UofWA Press, 2004, 417 pp.
- North American Elk: Ecology and Management, Smithsonian Institution Press, 2002, Thomas was co-editor.
- Wildlife habitats in managed forests: the Blue Mountains of Oregon and Washington, Agriculture Handbook No. 553, USDA, 1979. Thomas was editor.
- Viability assessments and management considerations for species associated with late-successional and old-growth forests of the Pacific Northwest, USFS, 1993.
- A Conservation Strategy for the Northern Spotted Owl, 1990
- Wildlife habitats in managed rangelands: The Great Basin of southeastern Oregon : riparian zones (General technical report PNW), 1979
- Forks in the Trail: A Conservationist's Trek to the Pinnacles of Natural Resource Management, Boone and Crockett Club, 2015
- Wilderness Journals: Wandering the High Lonesome, Boone and Crockett Club, 2015
- Hunting Around the World: Fair Chase Pursuits from Backcountry Wilderness to the Scottish Highlands, Boone and Crockett Club, 2015

== See also ==
- United States Chief Foresters
- U.S. Forest Service

Political offices
Preceded by F. Dale Robertson	Chief of the United States Forest Service; 1993–1996	Succeeded by Michael Dombeck
