= United States Forest Service =

Agency of the U.S. Department of Agriculture

- Logo of the U.S. Forest Service

- Flag of the U.S. Forest Service

Agency overview
- Formed: February 1, 1905; 121 years ago
- Preceding agency: Bureau of Forestry
- Jurisdiction: Federal government of the United States
- Headquarters: Sidney R. Yates Building 1400 Independence Ave SW Washington, D.C.
- Employees: c. 35,000 (FY 2016); 28,330 permanent; 4,488 seasonal (FY 2008)
- Annual budget: $9.5 billion
- Minister responsible: Michael Boren, Under Secretary of Agriculture for Natural Resources and Environment
- Agency executives: Tom Schultz, Chief; Chris French, Associate Chief
- Parent agency: United States Department of Agriculture
- Website: fs.usda.gov

The United States Forest Service (USFS) is an agency within the United States Department of Agriculture. It administers the nation's 154 national forests and 20 national grasslands covering 193 million acres (780,000 km^{2}) of land. The major divisions of the agency are the Chief's Office, National Forest System, State and Private Forestry, Business Operations, as well as Research and Development. The agency manages about 25% of federal lands and is the sole major national land management agency not part of the United States Department of the Interior (which manages the National Park Service, the United States Fish and Wildlife Service, and the Bureau of Land Management).

== History ==
In 1876, Congress formed the office of Special Agent in the Department of Agriculture to assess the quality and conditions of forests in the United States. Franklin B. Hough was appointed the head of the office. In 1881, the office was expanded into the newly formed Division of Forestry. The Forest Reserve Act of 1891 authorized withdrawing land from the public domain as forest reserves managed by the Department of the Interior. In 1901, the Division of Forestry was renamed the Bureau of Forestry.

The Transfer Act of 1905 transferred the management of forest reserves from the United States General Land Office of the Interior Department to the Bureau of Forestry, henceforth known as the United States Forest Service. Gifford Pinchot was the first United States chief forester in the presidency of Theodore Roosevelt.

A historical note to include is that the National Park Service was created in 1916 to manage Yellowstone and several other parks; in 1956, the Fish and Wildlife Service became the manager of lands reserved for wildlife. The Grazing Service and the United States General Land Office were combined to create the Bureau of Land Management in 1946. Also of note was that it was not until 1976 that the Federal Land Policy and Management Act became the national policy for retaining public land for federal ownership.

Significant federal legislation affecting the Forest Service includes the Weeks Act of 1911, the Taylor Grazing Act of 1934, P.L. 73-482; the Multiple Use – Sustained Yield Act of 1960, P.L. 86-517; the Wilderness Act, P.L. 88-577; the National Forest Management Act, P.L. 94-588; the National Environmental Policy Act, P.L. 91–190; the Cooperative Forestry Assistance Act, P.L. 95-313; and the Forest and Rangelands Renewable Resources Planning Act, P.L. 95-307.

From the early 1900s to the present, there has been a fierce rivalry over control of forests between the Department of Agriculture and the Department of the Interior. Their roles overlap but numerous proposals to combine the two have failed. In 2009, the Government Accountability Office (GAO) evaluated whether the Forest Service should be moved from the Department of Agriculture to the Department of the Interior, which already manages some 438 million acres (1,770,000 km^{2}) of public land through the National Park Service, the Fish and Wildlife Service, and the Bureau of Land Management. GAO ultimately did not offer a recommendation upon the conclusion of its performance audit. The Forest Service remains a part of the USDA.

In March 2026, President Donald Trump announced his plans to move the Forest Service's headquarters from Washington D.C. to Salt Lake City, Utah, and to close research facilities in 31 states.

== Organization ==
Map of all federally owned land in the United States. The dark green represents the Forest Service.

As of 2019, FY 2020 Forest Service total budget authority is $5.14 billion, a decrease of $815 million from 2019. The budget includes $2.4 billion for Wildland Fire Management, a decrease of $530 million from the 2019 Annualized Continuing Resolution because the "fire fix" cap adjustment becomes available in FY 2020, while the FY 2019 Annualized Continuing Resolution includes $500 million above the base as bridge to the first year of the fire fix.

The Forest Service, headquartered in Washington, D.C., has 27,062 permanent, full-time employees as of Sept. 20, 2018, including 541 in the headquarters office and 26,521 in regional and field office. In March 2026, the Forest Service announced the move of its main office to Salt Lake City, Utah, as part of a restructuring plan so their leaders can be closer to the forests and the people they serve in the West.

The Chief of the Forest Service is a career federal employee who oversees the agency. The Chief reports to the Under Secretary for Natural Resources and Environment in the U.S. Department of Agriculture, an appointee of the President confirmed by the Senate. The Chief's staff provides broad policy and direction for the agency, works with the Administration to develop a budget to submit to Congress, provides information to Congress on accomplishments, and monitors activities of the agency. There are five deputy chiefs for the following areas: National Forest System, State and Private Forestry, Research and Development, Business Operations, and Finance.

The USDA Forest Service's mission is to sustain the health, diversity, and productivity of the Nation's forests and grasslands to meet the needs of present and future generations. Its motto is "Caring for the land and serving people."

As the lead federal agency in natural resource conservation, the Forest Service provides leadership in the protection, management, and use of the nation's forest, rangeland, and aquatic ecosystems. The agency's ecosystem approach to management integrates ecological, economic, and social factors to maintain and enhance the quality of the environment to meet current and future needs. Through implementation of land and resource management plans, the agency ensures sustainable ecosystems by restoring and maintaining species diversity and ecological productivity that helps provide recreation, water, timber, minerals, fish, wildlife, wilderness, and aesthetic values for current and future generations of people.

The everyday work of the Forest Service balances resource extraction, resource protection, and providing recreation. The work includes managing 193 million acres (780,000 km^{2}) of national forest and grasslands, including 59 million acres (240,000 km^{2}) of roadless areas; 14,077 recreation sites; 143,346 miles (230,693 km) of trails; 374,883 miles (603,316 km) of roads; and the harvesting of 1.5 billion trees per year. Further, the Forest Service fought fires on 2.996 million acres (12,120 km^{2}) of land in 2007.

The Forest Service organization includes ranger districts, national forests, regions, research stations and research work units and the Northeastern Area Office for State and Private Forestry. Each level has responsibility for a variety of functions.

=== Regions ===
Map of the nine regions

There are nine regions in the Forest Service; numbered 1 through 10 (Region 7 was eliminated in 1965 when the current Eastern Region was created from the former Eastern and North Central regions. ). Each encompasses a broad geographic area and is headed by a regional forester who reports directly to the Chief. The regional forester has broad responsibility for coordinating activities among the various forests within the region, for providing overall leadership for regional natural resource and social programs, and for coordinated regional land use planning.

- Northern: based in Missoula, Montana, the Northern Region (R1) covers six states (Montana, Northern Idaho, North Dakota, Northwestern South Dakota, Northeast Washington, and Northwest Wyoming), twelve National Forests and one National Grassland.
- Rocky Mountain: based in Golden, Colorado, the Rocky Mountain Region (R2) covers five states (Colorado, Nebraska, Kansas and most of Wyoming and South Dakota), sixteen National Forests and seven National Grasslands.
- Southwestern: based in Albuquerque, New Mexico, the Southwestern Region (R3) covers two states (New Mexico and Arizona) and eleven National Forests.

- Intermountain: based in Ogden, Utah, the Intermountain Region (R4) covers four states (Southern Idaho, Nevada, Utah and Western Wyoming), twelve national forests.
- Pacific Southwest: based in Vallejo, California, The Pacific Southwest Region (R5) covers two states (California and Hawaii), eighteen National Forests and one Management Unit.
- Pacific Northwest: based in Portland, Oregon the Pacific Northwest Region (R6) covers two states (Washington and Oregon), seventeen National Forests, one National Scenic Area, one National Grassland, and two National Volcanic Monuments.
- Southern: based in Atlanta, Georgia, the Southern Region (R8) covers thirteen states (Alabama, Arkansas, Florida, Georgia, Kentucky, Louisiana, Mississippi, North and South Carolina, Tennessee, Texas, Oklahoma and Virginia; and Puerto Rico and the US Virgin Islands), and thirty-four National Forests.
- Eastern: based in Milwaukee, Wisconsin, the Eastern Region (R9) covers twenty states (Maine, Illinois, Ohio, Michigan, Wisconsin, Minnesota, Iowa, Missouri, Indiana, Pennsylvania, West Virginia, Maryland, New York, Connecticut, Rhode Island, Massachusetts, Vermont, New Hampshire, Delaware, and New Jersey), seventeen National Forests, one Grassland and America's Outdoors Center for Conservation, Recreation, and Resources.
- Alaska: based in Juneau, Alaska, the Alaska Region (R10) covers one state (Alaska), and two National Forests.

=== Ranger Districts ===
The administration of individual National Forests is subdivided into Ranger Districts. The Forest Service has over 600 ranger districts. Each district has a staff of 10 to 300 people under the direction of a district ranger, a line officer who reports to a forest supervisor. The districts vary in size from 50,000 acres (200 km^{2}) to more than 1 million acres (4,000 km^{2}). Most on-the-ground activities occur on ranger districts, including trail construction and maintenance, operation of campgrounds, oversight of a wide variety of special use permitted activities, management of vegetation and wildlife habitat, and cultural resource management.

== Major divisions ==
=== National Forest System ===
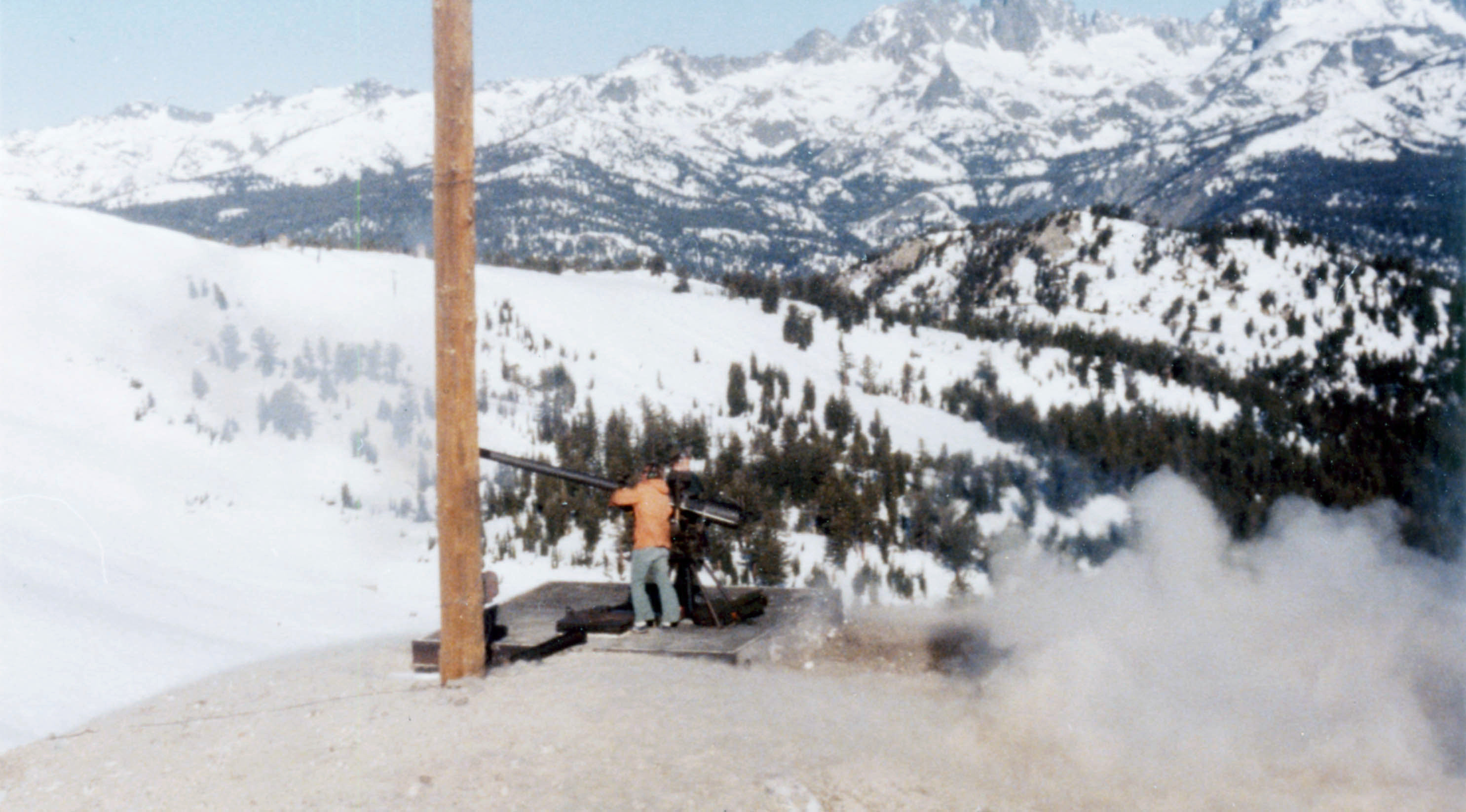
Forest Service team uses a 106 mm recoilless rifle for avalanche control at Mammoth Mountain in the Inyo National Forest in California. Note the Minarets in background.

The Forest Service oversees 155 national forests, 20 grasslands, and one tall-grass prairie. Each administrative unit typically comprises several ranger districts, under the overall direction of a forest supervisor. Within the supervisor's office, the staff coordinates activities among districts, allocates the budget, and provides technical support to each district. Forest supervisors are line officers and report to regional foresters.

The 193 million acres (780,000 km^{2}) of public land that are managed as national forests and grasslands are collectively known as the National Forest System. These lands are located in 44 states, Puerto Rico, and the Virgin Islands and comprise about 9% of the total land area in the United States. The lands are organized into 155 national forests and 20 national grasslands. The mission of the National Forest System is to protect and manage the forest lands so they best demonstrate the sustainable multiple-use management concept, using an ecological approach, to meet the diverse needs of people.

Wildfire management and suppression is a significant subdivision of the National Forest System. Wildfire suppression and prevention programs comprise nearly 50% of the Forest Service's overall budget and, during the peak fire season, it employs approximately 10,000-15,000 wildland firefighters. Wildland firefighters are often deployed on an interagency basis alongside firefighters from other federal and state land management agencies often with support from local and county structure fire departments. Additionally, Forest Service employees who are not normally full time firefighters are regularly called upon to respond to wildfire incidents in administrative, support, security, and even direct firefighting roles. For both primary fire and supplementary employees, fire assignments usually last 2–3 weeks at a time for each individual employee during which they typically work 16 hours on and eight hours off while sleeping in tents. After an assignment ends, the employee is granted three days of R&R before either returning to their day job or going on another assignment.

=== Law Enforcement & Investigations ===
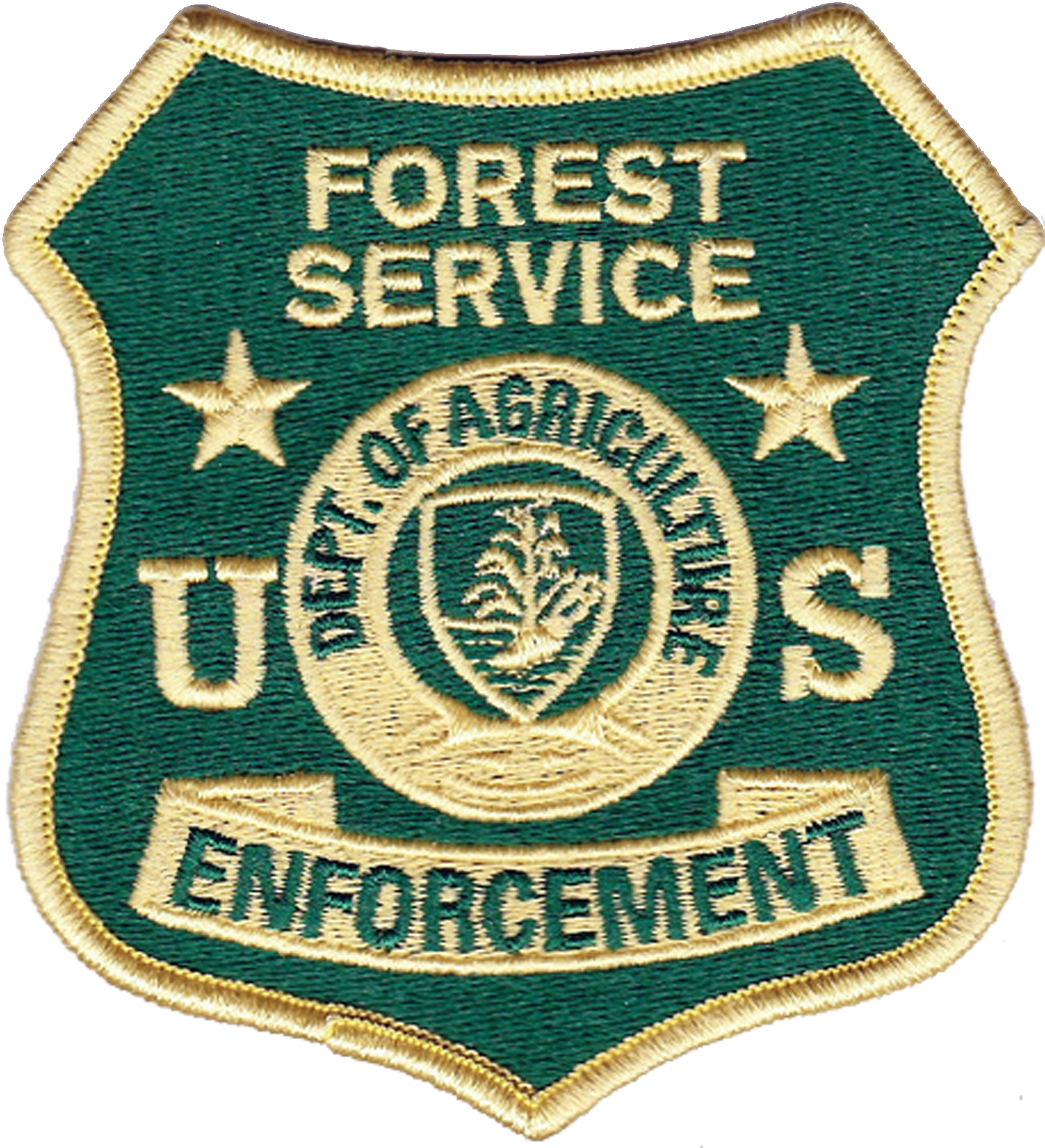
Patch of the Law Enforcement & Investigations unit

Law Enforcement & Investigations (LEI), headquartered in Washington, D.C., is a federal law enforcement agency of the U.S. government. It is responsible for enforcement of federal laws and regulations governing national forest lands and resources. All law enforcement officers and special agents receive their training through Federal Law Enforcement Training Center (FLETC).

Operations are divided into two major functional areas:

- Law enforcement: uniformed, high-visibility patrol officers
- Investigations: special agents who conduct more complex investigations including drug trafficking, large scale wildfire/arson, and theft/damage of natural resources and government property

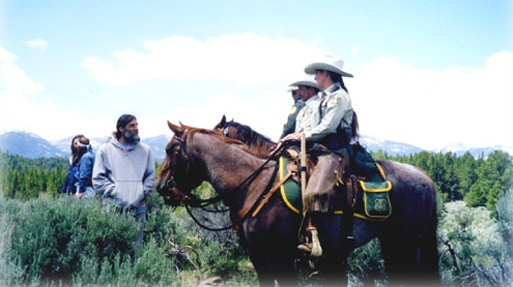
A horse patrol of the Law Enforcement & Investigations unit

Uniformed Law Enforcement Officers (LEOs) enforce federal laws and regulations governing national forest lands and resources. LEOs also enforce some or all state laws on National Forest Lands. As part of that mission, LEOs carry firearms, defensive equipment, make arrests, execute search warrants, complete reports, and testify in court. They establish a regular and recurring presence on a vast amount of public lands, roads, and recreation sites. The primary focus of their jobs is the protection of natural resources, protection of Forest Service employees and the protection of visitors. To cover the vast and varied terrain under their jurisdiction, they use modified 4x4 pickup trucks, Ford Crown Victoria Police Interceptors, special service SUVs, horses, K-9 units, helicopters, snowmobiles, ATVs, ROVs, dirt bikes, and boats.

Special Agents are criminal investigators who plan and conduct investigations concerning possible violations of criminal and administrative provisions of the Forest Service and other statutes under the United States Code. Special agents are normally plainclothes officers who carry concealed firearms, and other defensive equipment, make arrests, carry out complex criminal investigations, present cases for prosecution to U.S. Attorneys, and prepare investigative reports. All field agents are required to travel a great deal and usually maintain a case load of ten to fifteen ongoing criminal investigations at one time. Criminal investigators also conduct internal and civil claim investigations. An example of the latter would be large scale wildfire liability cases in which the government is seeking civil restitution for major damage to National Forest Lands.

As of 2025, 8 special agents and 1 K9 of the LEI have been killed in the line of duty.

LEI is also responsible for the oversight, training, and administration of the Forest Protection Officer (FPO) program. FPOs are unarmed, non-law enforcement, field going employees who have been granted the authority to enforce class B misdemeanors within Title 36, Part 261 of the Code of Federal Regulations (the day to day laws primarily governing the use of forests by the public). They do this by writing citations and mandatory federal court appearances. They must volunteer to become FPOs, pass an additional background check performed by LEI, and attend an initial training plus yearly recertification to maintain their authority. FPO is a “collateral duty” one performs in addition to their primary job; because of this, the majority of FPOs are Recreation Technicians, Wilderness Rangers, or Fire Prevention Patrol Technicians, but the program is open to any field going employee who meets the requirements. Since they are unarmed and not LEOs, FPOs do not engage in enforcement contacts in situations that have a high probability for violence including those involving excessive alcohol intoxication, illegal substances, domestic disputes, assault, gang activity, etc. instead disengaging and calling law enforcement immediately in such situations.

=== Research and development ===
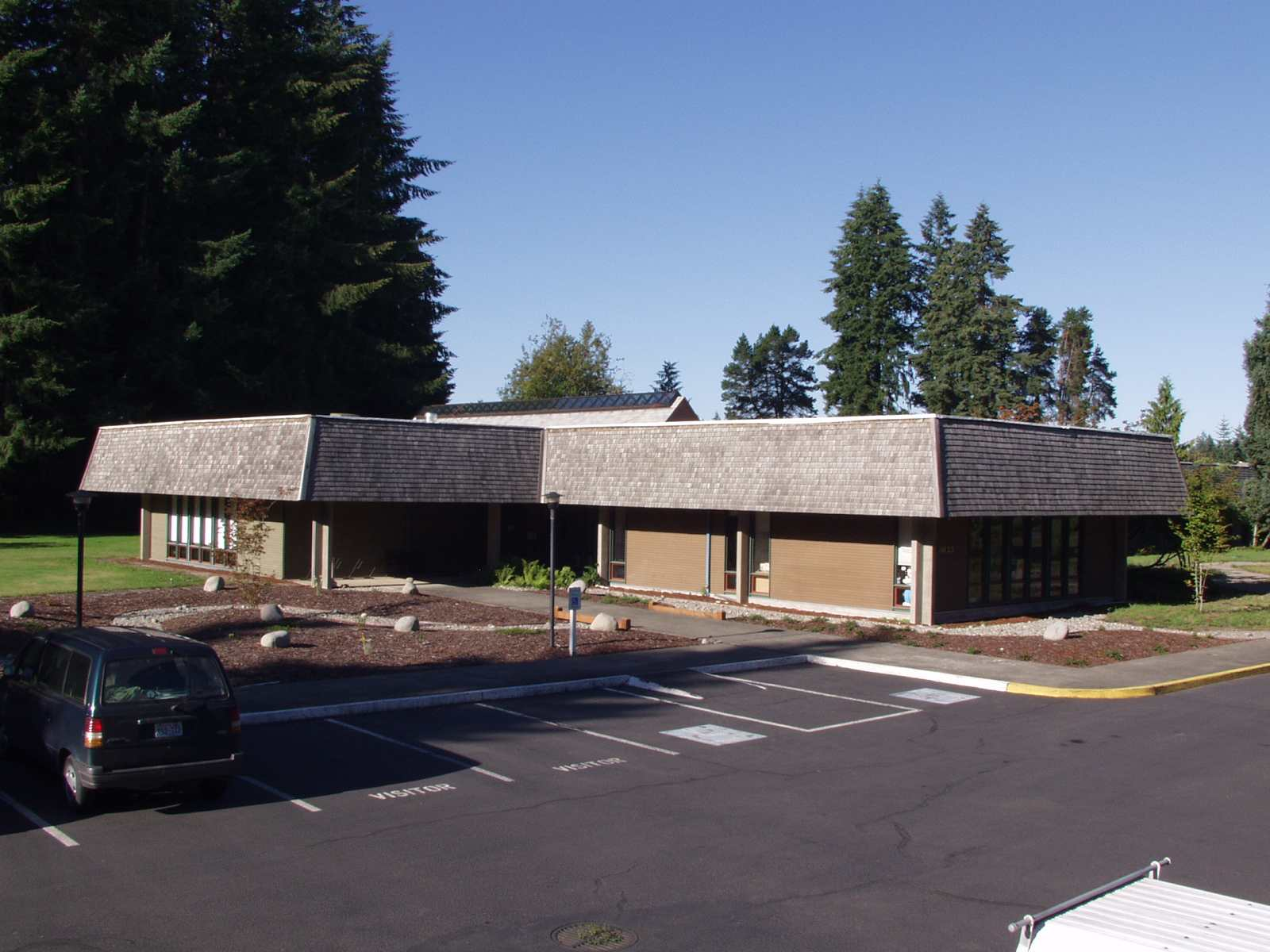
The U.S. Forest Service R&D lab in Olympia, Washington

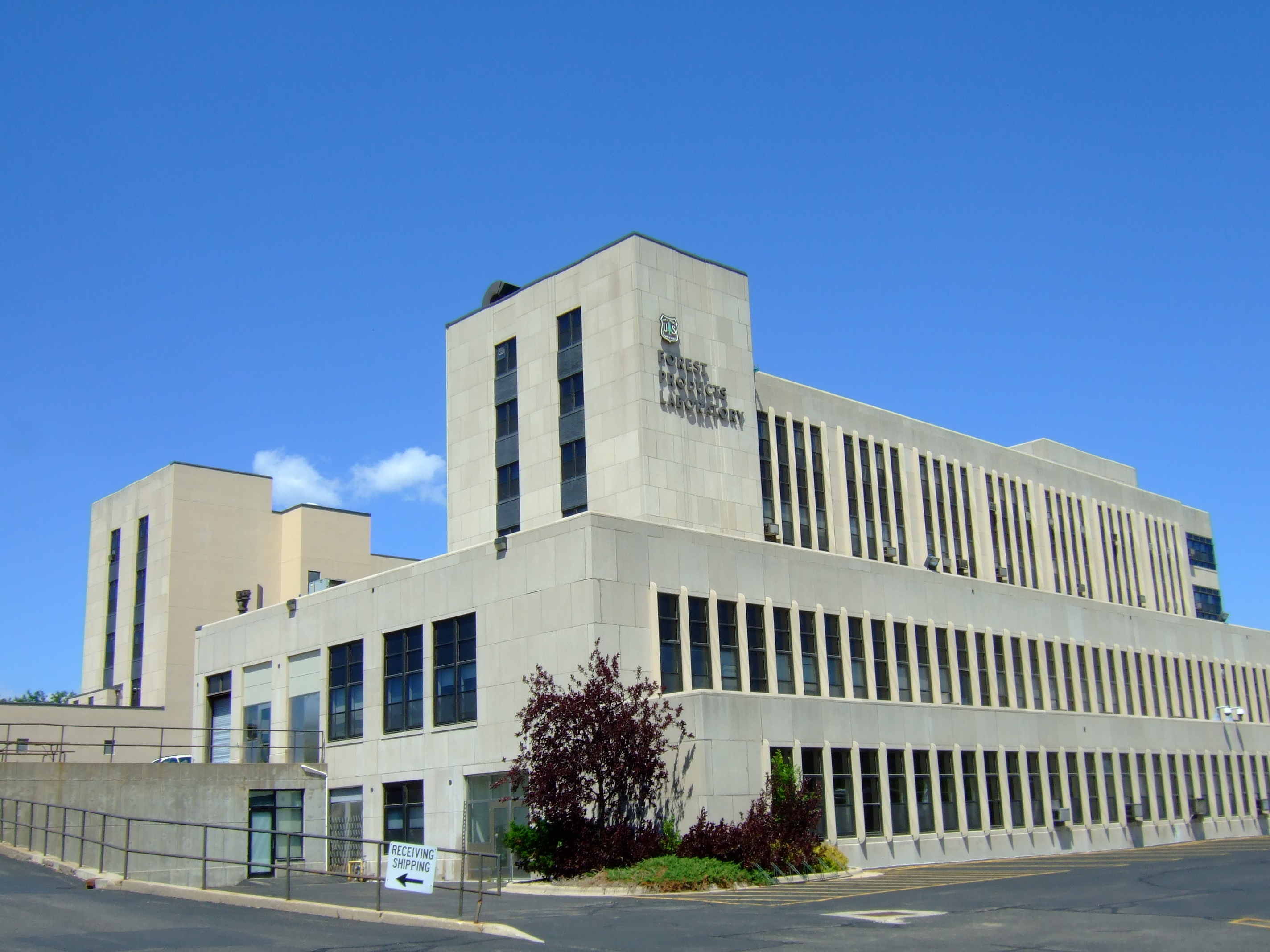
The Forest Products Laboratory, in Madison, Wisconsin

The research and development (R&D) arm of the Forest Service works to improve the health and use of the United States' forests and grasslands. Research has been part of the Forest Service mission since the agency's inception in 1905. The Forest Service researchers work in a range of biological, physical, and social science fields to promote sustainable management of United States' diverse forests and rangelands. Research employs about 550 scientists and several hundred technical and support staff, located at 67 sites throughout the United States and in Puerto Rico.

Research focuses on informing policy and land management decisions and includes addressing invasive insects, degraded river ecosystems, or sustainable ways to harvest forest products. The researchers work independently and with a range of partners (formerly through a National Partnership Office), including other agencies, academia, nonprofit groups, and industry. The information and technology produced through basic and applied science programs is available to the public for its benefit and use.

The Forest Service Research and Development deputy area includes five research stations, the Forest Products Laboratory, and the International Institute of Tropical Forestry, in Puerto Rico. Station directors, like regional foresters, report to the Chief. Research stations include Northern, Pacific Northwest, Pacific Southwest, Rocky Mountain, and Southern. There are 92 research work units located at 67 sites throughout the United States. there are 80 Experimental Forests and Ranges that have been established progressively since 1908; many sites are more than 50 years old. The system provides places for long-term science and management studies in major vegetation types of the 195 million acres (790,000 km^{2}) of public land administered by the Forest Service. Individual sites range from 47 to 22,500 ha in size.

Operations of Experimental Forests and Ranges are directed by local research teams for the individual sites, by Research Stations for the regions in which they are located, and at the level of the Forest Service. Major themes in research at the Experimental Forests and Ranges includes: develop of systems for managing and restoring forests, range lands, and watersheds; investigate the workings of forest and stream ecosystems; characterize plant and animal communities; observe and interpret long-term environmental change and many other themes.

In addition to the Research Stations, the USFS R&D branch also leads several National Centers such as the National Genomics Center for Wildlife and Fish Conservation.

=== State, Private and Tribal Forestry ===
The goal of the State and Private Forestry program is to assist with financial and technical assistance to private landowners, state agencies, tribes, and community resource managers. It provides assistance by helping sustain the United States' urban and rural forests and their associated communities from wildland fires, insects, disease, and invasive organisms. Approximately 537 staff are employed in the program and is administered through National Forest System regions and the Northeastern Area of the United States.

=== International programs ===
The Forest Service plays a key role in formulating policy and coordinating U.S. support for the protection and sound management of the world's forest resources. It works closely with other agencies such as USAID, the State Department, and the Environmental Protection Agency, as well as with nonprofit development organizations, wildlife organizations, universities, and international assistance organizations. The Forest Service's international work serves to link people and communities striving to protect and manage forests throughout the world. The program also promotes sustainable land management overseas and brings important technologies and innovations back to the United States. The program focuses on conserving key natural resource in cooperation with countries across the world.

== Responses to environmental challenges ==
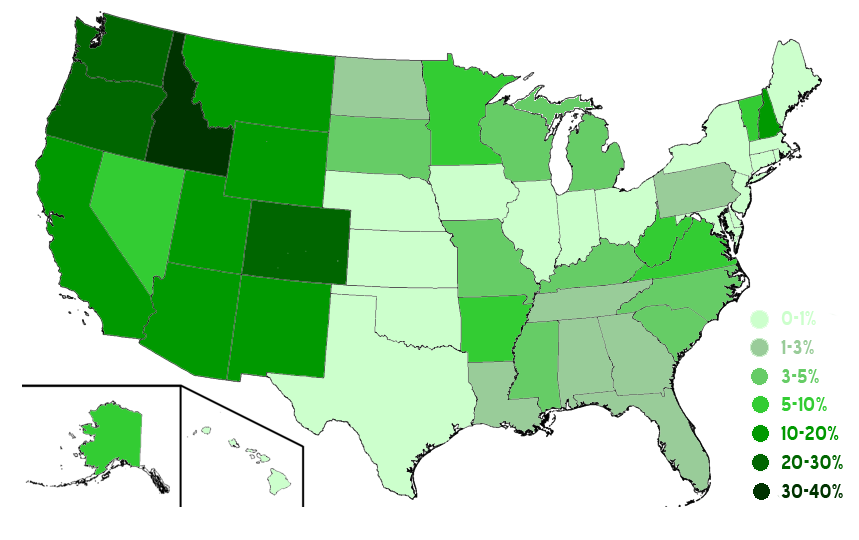
More than 80% of the 193 million acres (780,000 km^{2}) of land managed by the United States Forest Service is in the western states. This map shows USFS lands as a percentage of total land area in each state.

Although a large volume of timber is logged every year, not all National Forests are entirely forested. There are tidewater glaciers in the Tongass National Forest in Alaska and ski areas such as Alta, Utah in the Wasatch-Cache National Forest. In addition, the Forest Service is responsible for managing National Grasslands in the midwest. Furthermore, areas designated as wilderness by acts of Congress, prohibit logging, mining, road and building construction and land leases for purposes of farming and or livestock grazing.

Since 1978, several Presidents have directed the USFS to administer National Monuments inside of preexisting National Forests.

- Admiralty Island National Monument – Alaska
- Giant Sequoia National Monument – California
- Misty Fjords National Monument – Alaska
- Mount St. Helens National Volcanic Monument – Washington
- Newberry National Volcanic Monument – Oregon
- Santa Rosa and San Jacinto Mountains National Monument – California (jointly with the Bureau of Land Management)

The Forest Service also manages Grey Towers National Historic Site in Milford, Pennsylvania, the home and estate of its first Chief, Gifford Pinchot.

=== Fighting fires ===
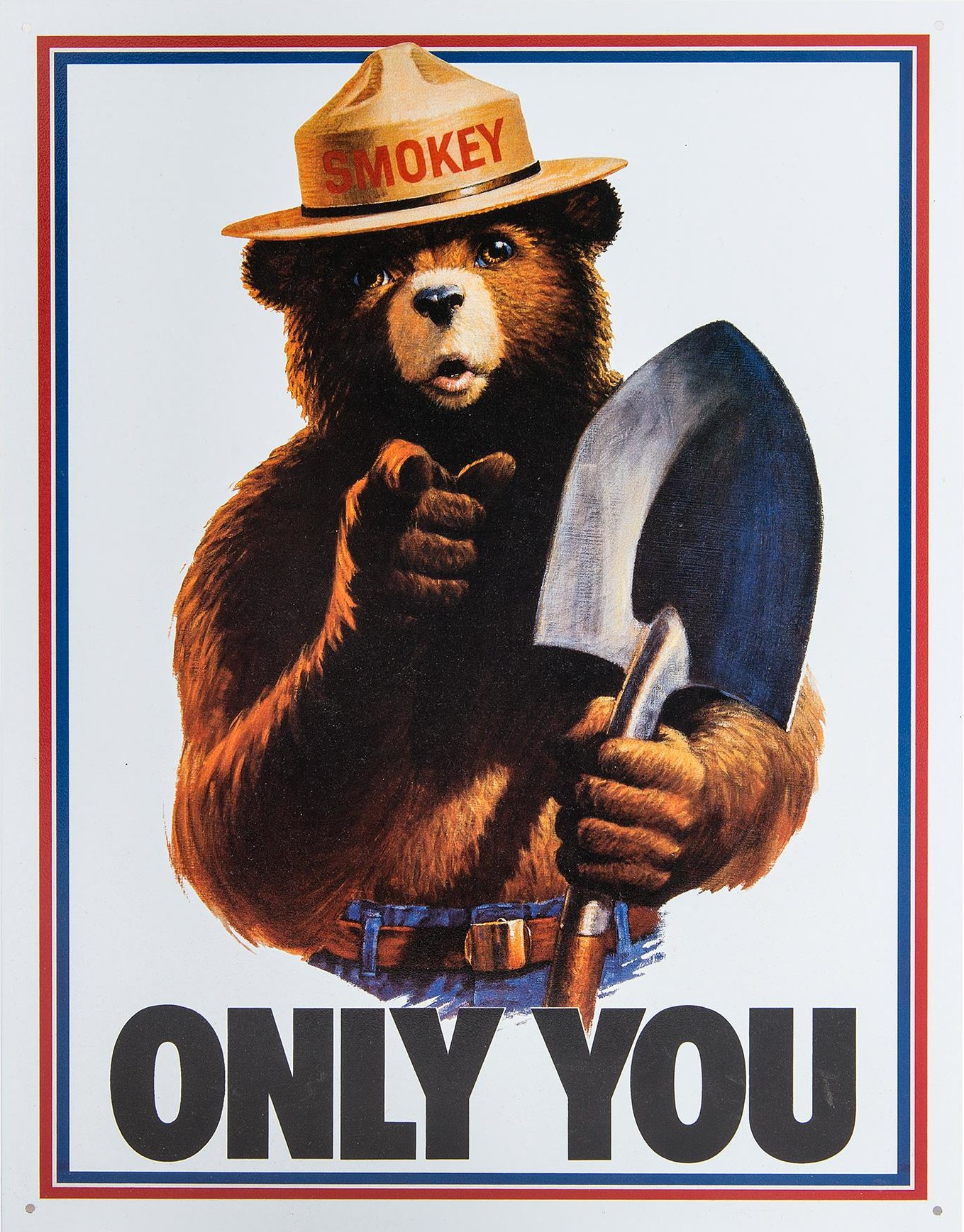
Smokey Bear poster

By 1935, the U.S. Forest Service's fire management policy stipulated that all wildfires were to be suppressed by 10 am the morning after they were first spotted.

In August 1944, to reduce the number of forest fires, the Forest Service and the Wartime Advertising Council began distributing fire education posters featuring a black bear. The poster campaign was a success; the black bear would later be named Smokey Bear, and would, for decades, be the "spokesbear" for the Forest Service. Smokey Bear has appeared in innumerable TV commercials; his popular catch phrase, "Only YOU can prevent forest fires"—later changed to wildfires—is one of the most widely recognized slogans in the United States. According to the Advertising Council, Smokey Bear is the most recognized icons in advertising history and has appeared almost everywhere via Public Service Announcements in print, radio, television. Smokey Bear, an icon protected by law, is jointly owned by the Forest Service, the Ad Council and the National Association of State Foresters.

In 1965, at the request of the Joint Chiefs of Staff, the Forest Service was commissioned by the Advanced Research Projects Agency (ARPA) to research the use of forest fire as a military weapon. A report was published in June 1970 and declassified in May 1983.

In September 2000, the Departments of Agriculture and the Interior developed a plan to respond to the fires of 2000, to reduce the impacts of these wildland fires on rural communities, and to ensure sufficient firefighting resources in the future. The report is entitled "Managing the Impacts of Wildfire on Communities and the Environment: A Report to the President In Response to the Wildfires of 2000"—The National Fire Plan for short. The National Fire Plan continues to be an integral part of the Forest Service today. The following are important operational features of the National Fire Plan:

- Federal Wildland Fire Management Policy: The 1995 Federal Wildland Fire Management Policy and the subsequent 2001 Federal Wildland Fire Management Policy act as the foundation of the National Fire Plan.
- Basic Premise of the National Fire Plan: Investing now in an optimal firefighting force, hazardous fuels reduction, and overall community protection will provide for immediate protection and future cost savings.
- Funding: Initially (2001), the National Fire Plan provided for an additional $1,100,994,000 for the Forest Service for a total wildland fire management budget of $1,910,193,000. In 2008, the total amount for the Forest Service in wildland fire management (not including emergency fire suppression funding) is $1,974,276,000.
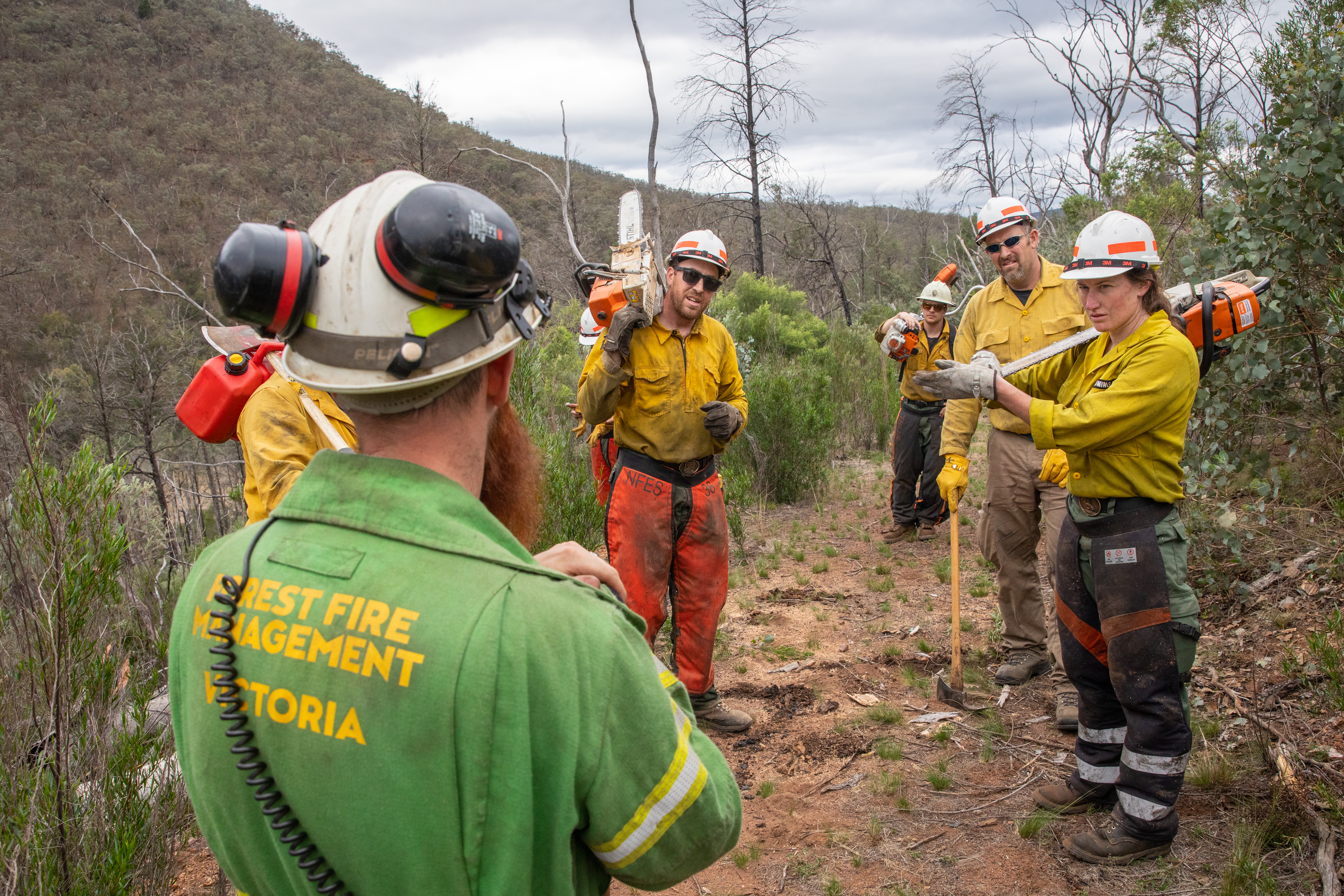
  US Forest Service firefighters and Australian firefighters discuss plans to clear brush along a trail in Victoria, Australia.

In August 2014, Tom Vilsack, the Secretary of Agriculture, announced that the agency would have to put $400 to $500 million in wildfire prevention projects on hold because funding for firefighting was running low as the fiscal year ended. The decision was meant to preserve resources for fighting active fires burning in California, Oregon, Washington and Idaho. Politicians of both parties indicated they believed the then-current funding structure was broken, but did not agree on steps to fix the funding allocation.

During the 2019–2020 bushfires in Australia, the US Forest Services sent a contingent of firefighters. They worked alongside firefighters from other American fire departments.

=== Climate adaptation ===
In April 2023, the U.S. Forest Service published a proposed rulemaking in response to climate change on the topic of improving climate resilience on the public lands that it manages. The agency introduced the need for such rulemaking as:

Climate change and related stressors, such as wildfire, drought, insects and disease, extreme weather events, and chronic stress on ecosystems are resulting in increasing impacts with rapid and variable rates of change on national forests and grasslands. These impacts can be compounded by fire suppression, development in the Wildland Urban Interface (WUI), and non-climate informed timber harvest and reforestation practices.

The foundational question pertained to climate adaptation: "How should the Forest Service adapt current policies and develop new policies and actions to conserve and manage the national forests and grasslands for climate resilience, so that the Agency can provide for ecological integrity and support social and economic sustainability over time?" Ancillary questions pertained to both "adaptation planning" and "adaptation practices".

The background section of the proposed rulemaking includes a short history of how agency responsibilities have grown and evolved over its 118-year history in accordance with "what the American people desire from their natural resources at any given point in time."

=== Carbon capture and storage ===
In the spring of 2023, the USDA proposed a change to its regulations to allow for the "responsible deployment of" carbon capture, utilization, and sequestration on National Forests lands.

== Budget ==
Although it is part of the Department of Agriculture, the Forest Service receives its budget through the Subcommittee on Appropriations—Interior, Environment, and Related Agencies.

Annualized continuing resolutions by financial year in thousands of dollars
Appropriations	2011	2012	2013	2014	2015	2016	2017	2018	2019	2020	2021	2022
Research	306,637	295,300	279,854	292,805	296,000	291,000	290,447	306,216	297,000	305,000	258,760	313,560
State and Private Forestry	277,596	252,926	239,696	229,980	232,653	237,023	236,573	319,737	335,525	346,990	267,180	304,614
National Forest System	1,542,248	1,554,137	1,455,341	1,496,330	1,494,330	1,509,364	1,506,496	1,890,313	1,923,750	1,957,510	1,786,870	1,786,870
Wildland Fire Management	2,168,042	1,974,467	1,868,795	2,162,302	2,333,298	2,386,329	2,381,795	2,314,793	2,880,338	2,350,620	1,927,241	2,369,634
Capital Improvement and Maintenance	472,644	394,089	358,510	350,000	360,374	364,164	363,472	361,014	449,000	455,000	140,371	148,371
Land Acquisition	33,982	53,701	50,665	44,654	48,666	64,601	64,478	55,204	65,379	79,748	814	814
Other appropriations	5,179	5,875	4,821	5,540	4,865	4,865	4,856	4,832	4,610	5,545	3,863	7,863
Subtotal, discretionary appropriations *	5,096,746	4,845,876	4,936,514	5,496,611	5,073,246	5,680,346	5,669,553	5,779,217	5,955,602	7,450,413	7,451,262	8,436,564
Subtotal, permanent appropriations	627,234	581,595	507,631	566,231	293,316	517,889	348,252	296,285	285,396	528,550	919,265	724,899
Total	5,858,615	5,584,586	5,749,146	6,264,941	5,547,812	6,331,984	6,168,886	6,190,502	5,955,692	8,142,677	8,370,527	9,161,463
* Includes regular, supplemental and emergency appropriations

== Popular culture ==
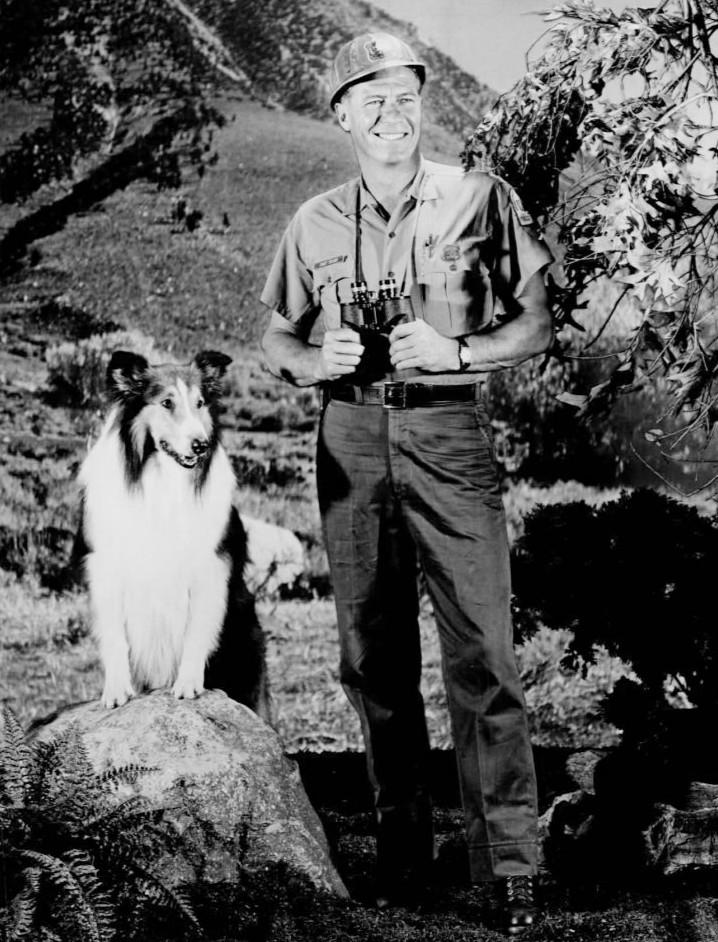
Lassie with Robert Bray as U.S. Forest Ranger Corey Stuart

The Forest Service achieved widespread awareness during the 1960s, as it became the setting for the long running classic TV show Lassie, with storylines focusing on Lassie's adventures with various forest rangers.

The iconic collie's association with the Forest Service led to Lassie receiving numerous awards and citations from the U.S. Senate and the Department of Agriculture, and was partly responsible for a bill regarding soil and water pollution that was signed into law in early 1968 by President Lyndon Johnson, which was dubbed by some as "The Lassie Program".

In the 2019 family comedy movie Playing with Fire, John Cena plays a U.S. Forest Service firefighter who (along with his crew) watches over a group of rambunctious children while searching for their parents after rescuing them from a fire in the wilderness during a family vacation.

== Incidents and concerns ==
The history of the Forest Service has had various interests and national values grapple with the appropriate management of the many resources within the forests. These values and resources include grazing, timber, mining, recreation, wildlife habitat, and wilderness. Because of continuing development elsewhere, the large size of National Forests have made them de facto wildlife reserves for a number of rare and common species. In recent decades, the importance of mature forest for the spotted owl and a number of other species led to great changes in timber harvest levels.

In 1910, the first Chief of the Forest Service, Gifford Pinchot, was dismissed by President Taft as a result of the Pinchot-Ballinger controversy.

In the 1990s, the agency was involved in a scandal when it illegally provided surplus military aircraft to private contractors for use as airtankers in 1980s.

The policy on road building within the National Forests is another controversial issue. In 1999, President Clinton ordered a temporary moratorium on new road construction in the National Forests to "assess their ecological, economic, and social values and to evaluate long-term options for their management." The Bush administration replaced this 5 1/2 years later, with a system where each state could petition the Forest Service to open forests in their territory to road building.

In 1997, the agency reported it was losing money on its timber sales.

In 2018, the Forest Service was reprimanded by the 4th U.S. Circuit Court of Appeals. The Service had issued permits for the Atlantic Coast Pipeline to build through parts of the George Washington and Monongahela National Forests and a right of way across the Appalachian Trail – in violation of both the National Forest Management Act of 1976 and the National Environmental Policy Act.

Wildland firefighters are at high risk for mental health concerns, with a survey in 2018 of 2,600 wildland firefighters showing 20% has experienced suicidal ideations, and 14% indicates signs of probable PTSD. Both rates are much higher than the general population.

In 2020, Melody Starya Mobley, the first black female forester hired by the Forest Service, claimed she had been sexually assaulted by a colleague in the late 70s, citing misogyny and racism within the institution as reasons why she did not speak up at the time. She also stated that though there was a witness present, her assault was largely ignored when she disclosed it to the agency and the perpetrator was never punished.

A wave of mass layoffs by the Trump administration in early 2025—following shortly after the extreme Southern California wildfires of January—failed to account for the need to prepare workers for the fire season ahead; in dismissing probationary employees, not only did the administration disregard the fact that many affected staff actually had valuable years of experience with the agency (and were simply in current positions new to them), it severely weakened the efficiency of seasonal workflows necessary to mitigate the destructive potential of upcoming wildfires. This is on top of an already understaffed workforce. In 2024, officials reported shocking low number of applicants in key positions, with a statewide vacancy rate of 35% in California.

== Notable members ==
- Michael Dombeck
- Franklin B. Hough
- Annie E. Hoyle
- Orlando Jordan
- Aldo Leopold
- Norman Maclean
- Ed Pulaski
- Jack Ward Thomas
- Theodore Woolsey
- James B. Yule
- Raphael Zon

== See also ==
- American Experience (season 27) "The Big Burn" (2014)
- Architects of the United States Forest Service
- Environmental history of the United States
- Forest ranger
- Forests of the United States
- List of legislation governing the United States Forest Service
- List of national forests of the United States
- National Forest Foundation
- Range Improvement Funds
- Recreation Residences
- Wildfire suppression
