= Alles =

Alles is a surname. Notable people with the surname include:

- A. C. Alles (1911–2003), Sri Lankan judge and writer
- Arthur Nelson Alles (1915–1979), Canadian politician
- Fred Lind Alles (1851–1945), American businessman and politician
- Gordon Alles (1901–1963), American chemist and pharmacologist
- Gustavo Alles (born 1990), Uruguayan footballer
- Pierre Allès (1916–2012), Algerian racing cyclist
- R. I. T. Alles (1932–2013), Sri Lankan educator and politician
- Tiran Alles (born 1960), Sri Lankan businessman and politician

== See also ==
- Über alles (disambiguation)
- Alle (disambiguation)
- All (disambiguation)
