= Maxson (surname) =

Maxson is a surname. Notable people with the surname include:

- Alvin Maxson (1951–2022), American football player
- Eileen Maxson (born 1980), American artist
- Herbert B. Maxson (died 1927), American civil engineer
- Louis Maxson (1855–1916), American archer
- Orrin T. Maxson (1823–1895), American physician and Wisconsin pioneer
- Robert Maxson, American academic
- Stephen Maxson, American behavior geneticist
- William Maxson (1930–2013), American Air Force officer
