= George Barstow =

George Barstow may refer to:

- George Barstow (California politician) (1824–1883), professor, lawyer, historian, and politician
- George E. Barstow (1849–1924), Texas land developer and politician in Rhode Island
- Sir George Barstow (civil servant) (1874–1966), British civil servant and businessman

== See also ==
- George O. Brastow (1811–1878), American politician from Massachusetts
