= Simi Linton =

- Born: July 29, 1947; New York City, New York, United States
- Education: New York University; Columbia University
- Known for: Disability Studies; Invitation to Dance
- Website: similinton.com

Simi Linton is an American arts consultant, author, filmmaker, and activist. Her work focuses on Disability Arts, disability studies, and ways that disability rights and disability justice perspectives can be brought to bear on the arts.

== Career ==
Linton was on the faculty at Hunter College of the City University of New York from 1985 to 1998, was co-director of the University Seminar in Disability Studies at Columbia University from 2003 to 2007, and was the Hofstra University Presidential Visiting Scholar in 2006. She was a visiting scholar at the NYU Center for Disability Studies and Department of Media, Culture, and Communication from 2021-2024, where she directed the Ford- and Mellon-funded project Proclaiming Disability Arts. She received the Barnard College Medal of Distinction in 2015, and an honorary Doctor of Arts from Middlebury College in 2016.

In 1998, she founded Disability/Arts Consultancy. Since then, Linton has worked with organizations such as United States Artists, Whitney Museum of American Art, Alliance for Inclusion in the Arts, Gibney Dance, The Public Theatre, Dance/NYC, the Margaret Mead Film Festival, and other cultural, activist and academic institutions.

In 2014, Linton and Christian von Tippelskirch produced and directed the documentary film Invitation to Dance. The film was based, in part, on Linton's memoir My Body Politic and her long history of activism. The film premiered at the Santa Barbara International Film Festival in 2014, where it was nominated for a Social Justice Award by the Fund for Santa Barbara.

Linton was appointed to the New York City Cultural Affairs Advisory Commission (2015) and the She Built NYC Committee (2018) by New York City Mayor Bill de Blasio.

== Publications ==
- Linton, Simi (2006). My Body Politic, University of Michigan Press ISBN 978-0-472-11539-6
- Linton, Simi (1988). Claiming Disability, New York University Press ISBN 978-0-8147-5134-3
