= Alle =

Alle or Allé may refer to:

- The German name for the Łyna River, a river since 1945 in Poland and the Russian Kaliningrad Oblast
- Alle, Switzerland, a community in the Swiss canton of Jura
- Alle, Belgium in the province of Namur, Belgium
- Little auk (Alle alle), a bird which is the only member of the genus Alle
- August Alle (1890–1952), Estonian writer
- Charles Allé (1904–1994), French footballer
- Moritz Allé (1837–1913), Austrian mathematician
- Alle language, a language of Ethiopia

== See also ==
- Allée (landscape avenue)
- Alles (disambiguation)
- All (disambiguation)
