= Maxson =

Maxson may refer to:

- Maxson (surname)
- Maxson Airfield, an airport in Alexandria Bay, New York, United States

== See also ==
- Maxon (disambiguation)
