= Pecos-Barstow-Toyah Independent School District =

School district in Texas

Pecos-Barstow-Toyah Independent School District is a public school district based in Pecos, Texas, United States. In addition to Pecos, the district serves the towns of Toyah in Reeves County and Barstow in western Ward County. In 2009, the school district was rated "academically acceptable" by the Texas Education Agency.

== Schools ==
- Pecos High (grades 9-12)
- Crockett Middle (grades 6-8)
- Zavala Elementary (grades 4-5)
- Austin Elementary (grades 1-3)
- Pecos Kindergarten (prekindergarten and kindergarten)
