= National Irrigation Congress =

Agricultural pressure group

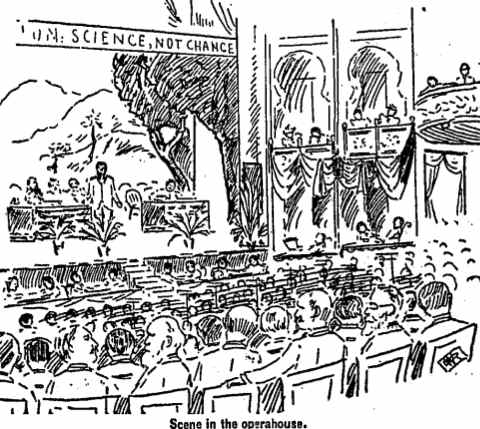
1893 session of National Irrigation Congress in Los Angeles Opera House

The National Irrigation Congress was held periodically in the Western United States beginning in 1891 and ending in 1916, by which time the organization had changed its name to International Irrigation Congress. It was a "powerful pressure group."

== Nineteenth century ==
1891 The first congress was organized in Salt Lake City by William Ellsworth Smythe, the editor of the publication Irrigation Age, Elwood Mead, a Wyoming irrigation engineer, and Senator Francis E. Warren of Wyoming. As a result, irrigation became a substantial national issue. The congress passed a resolution urging that public lands controlled by the federal government be turned over to the states and territories "needful of irrigation." Between 450 and 600 delegates attended.

1893 The panic of 1893 undermined financial backing for the congress; nevertheless, the second conference opened in August 1893 in the Grand Opera House in Los Angeles, California, with an address by John P. Irish of San Francisco and the presence of a number of foreign representatives who had responded to an appeal by the State Department to attend the meeting. They came from France, Russia, Mexico, Ecuador and New South Wales. The body also appointed commissioners in every state and territory to survey arid lands and submit the results to the U.S. Congress.

C.W. Allingham of Los Angeles introduced his "heliomotor," a sun-powered engine that he said could be used to pump irrigation water. The Los Angeles Times reported: "He said it might be stated that the idea was a cranky one, but it must be remembered that it was the cranks that made things move. (Laughter.)"

1894 The congress in Omaha, Nebraska, was highlighted by adoption of a plan to settle 250 families in a planned community called New Plymouth in Idaho. "Farmers were ... restricted to living no more than two miles away from their crops, and the sale of alcohol was banned ... to keep the farmers sober and well-mannered at all times."

John Wesley Powell, director of the United States Geological Survey, "talked of the storm-water storage plan. He thought that this was still an experiment. In Utah and California, where it had been tried, it had been successful."

1895

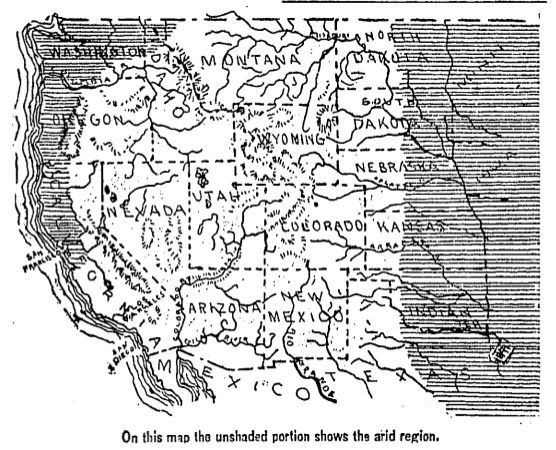
Arid regions of the United States as published in the Los Angeles Times, 1893

A congress held in Albuquerque, New Mexico, in 1895 adopted a resolution that stated in part:

We declare that it should be the policy of [the United States] Congress to frame laws which will enable the people to obtain possession of the arid public lands upon terms which bear a fair relation to the cost of reclamation, and that this cost should be regulated by public authority. ... We earnestly ask for the creation of a National Irrigation Commission ... to be composed of men familiar with the condition of the arid region and including a representative of skilled engineers. We would have this commission empowered to use the facilities of the Department of the Interior or Agriculture and of War.

1896 At the fifth congress in Phoenix, Arizona, A.G. Wolfenbarger of Nebraska described the West as "a country destined to become at some future time the very Garden of the Gods, the home of intelligence, learning, riches, philanthropy, everything that can measure the power and greatness of a great nation ... millions of people are waiting to be led out into these great plains waiting to welcome them to a home that will make them absolutely independent."

1897 The congress of 1897 in Lincoln, Nebraska, which attracted representatives from thirteen states, was opened with an address by E.R. Moses, chairman of the national executive committee, who said:

We irrigationists are satisfied that [the U.S.] Congress will have to adopt our plan of preventing the overflow of large streams by the storage of waters near the [river] heads in such a manner as to feed the stream at times of low water, and at other times to be used in irrigation, navigation, and manufacturing industries ... and large tracts of arid land can be reclaimed by these waters and opened for settlement.

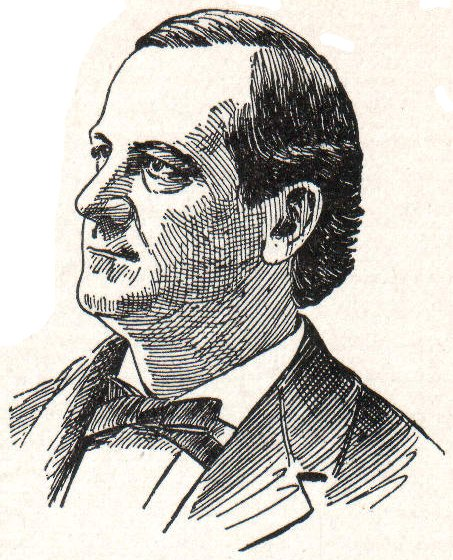
William Jennings Bryan

Defeated Democratic candidate for the U.S. Presidency William Jennings Bryan told the delegates he was opposed "to turning over large bodies of land to corporations controlling water rights, unless safeguards were thrown around the transaction to protect small holders of irrigable land."

1898 The 1898 congress in Cheyenne, Wyoming, called for the federal government to allocate "no less than $100,000 for hydrographic surveys for the measurement of streams and the survey of reservoir sites" and urged the formation of a forestry bureau. But a Colorado legislator reportedly likened the America West "to a graveyard, littered with defunct irrigation corporations."

1899 A battle developed at the 1899 Wichita, Kansas, meeting of another Western body — the Trans-Mississippi Congress — over the stand by the National Irrigation Congress favoring federal "storage reservoirs" and the "leasing of the public grazing lands by the states without cession and those who advocated the public lands to the States and Territories." After much debate, the Trans-Mississippi group endorsed the policy of the Irrigation Congress.

Hiram M. Chittenden

1900 The 1900 meeting of the Irrigation Congress in Chicago, Illinois, featured a paper read by Captain Hiram M. Chittenden of the Army Corps of Engineers contending that the best way to get the U.S. Congress to act on irrigation was to "divorce the storage reservoir problem from that of irrigation in general, that the former is properly within the field of the General Government, and is in a fair way to secure favorable action by Congress, provided that it is well understood that no attempt will be made to involve the Government in irrigation work."

== Twentieth century ==
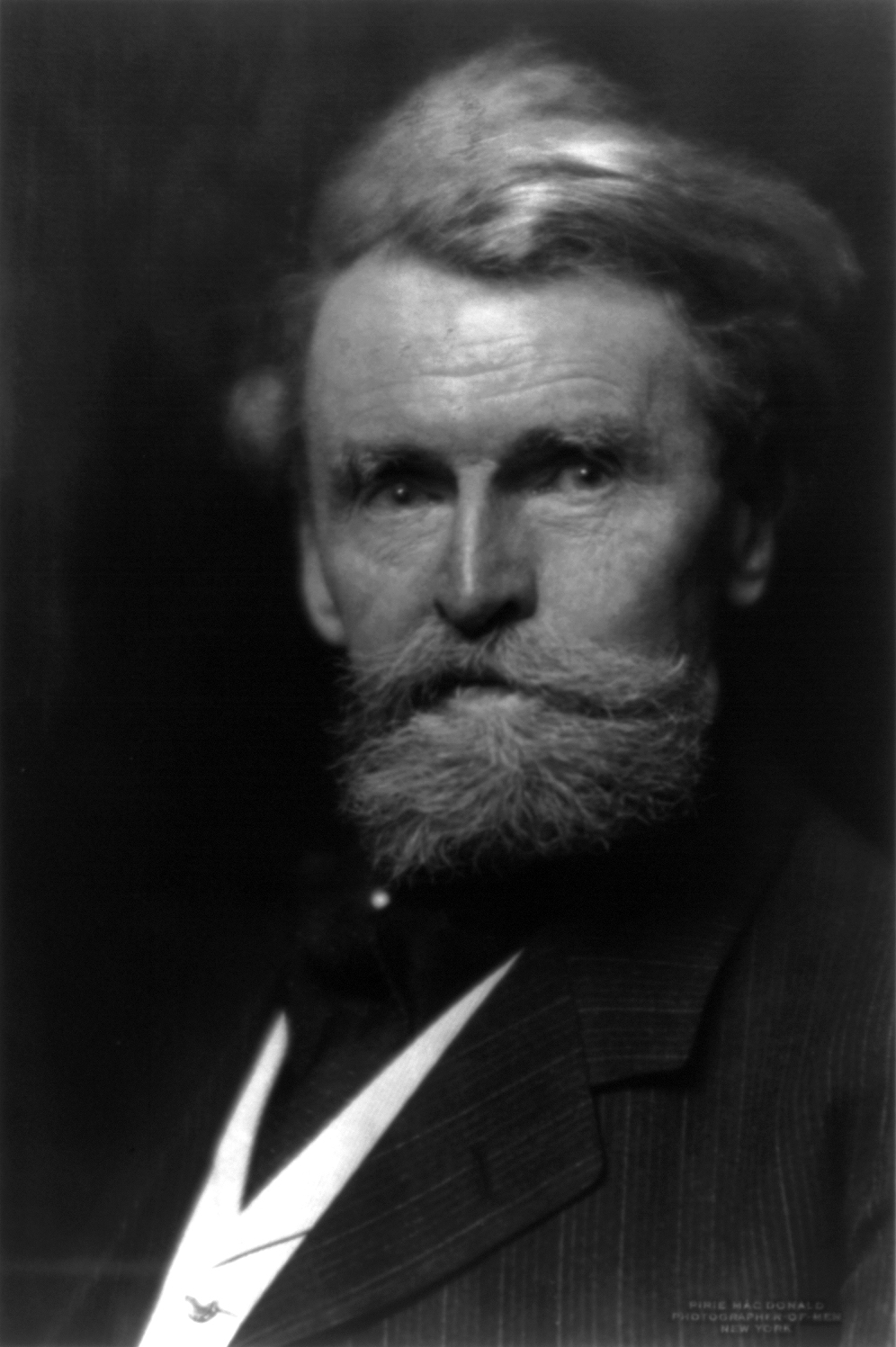
William A. Clark

1903 The eleventh congress was held in Ogden, Utah, in September 1903, with Senator William A. Clark of Montana as chairman. The agenda included "Practical irrigation and forestry lessons; reports of experts; application of provisions of the Reclamation act; State progress under the National act; views on settlement of legal complications, and the theme of colonization."

Commander Frederick Booth-Tucker of the Salvation Army made the principal address, arguing on behalf of the a plan to "colonize the irrigated lands of the West with poor people from the cities." He said some 3,000 acres of land had been settled in such a way in Colorado, California and Ohio.

1905 The 1905 meeting of the congress, held in Portland, Oregon, in conjunction with the Lewis and Clark Centennial Exposition, attracted 1,200 delegates. A plan to hold "sectional meetings" was deemed a failure because most of the delegates preferred to attend the fair instead, a New York Times reporter said.

1906 The congress, held in Boise, Idaho, took a stand against any "legislative concessions in favor of Philippine sugar," a nation recently conquered by the United States, so that sugar-beet production "may be fully developed in the arid regions of America." The delegates also rescinded a resolution that the 11th conference had adopted in 1903 endorsing Zea Maize as the "national floral emblem."

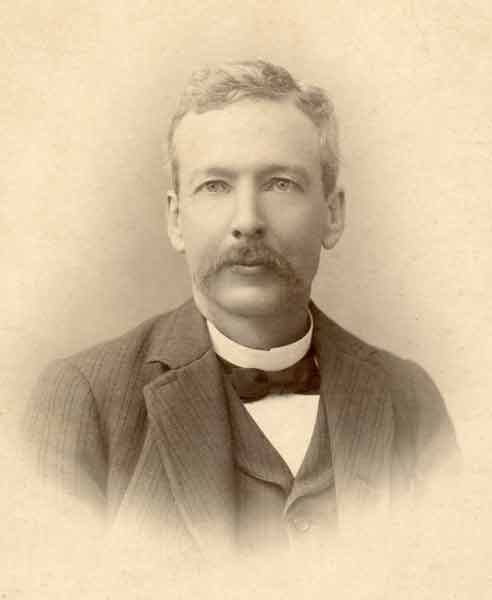
Luther Burbank

1907 The congress was opened in Sacramento, California, in September, held in conjunction with a colorful Interstate Exposition of Irrigated Land and Forest Products. The "four great objects of the congress" were "To save the forests, store the floods, reclaim the deserts, and make homes on the land." Agronomist Luther Burbank, the "Wizard of the Plant Industry," told the delegates he had developed a "thornless cactus" that would "become the great fodder of arid regions."

1908 For the 12-day conference in Albuquerque, New Mexico, beginning September 29, the federal government appropriated $50,000 to underwrite an exposition exhibiting the products of agriculture. Territorial Governor George Curry moved his office from the state capital at Santa Fe so he could be on hand to greet the 4,000 people who eventually arrived. New Mexicans used the event to drum up support for statehood, which was granted four years later, in 1912. A reporter reviewing the event said that:

The toniclike effect of the entire affair buoyed spirits of Albuquerque's many boosters and reinforced in them the conviction that their city, in the century stretching ahead, was marked for bright and wondrous things.

1909 Gifford Pinchot, who had been appointed by President William McKinley to head the government's Division of Forestry in 1898 and who had run the U.S. Forest Service since it had taken over management of forest reserves from the United States General Land Office in 1905, became convinced that U.S. Secretary of the Interior Richard A. Ballinger intended to "stop the conservation movement". In August, speaking at the annual meeting of the National Irrigation Congress in Spokane, Washington, Pinchot accused Ballinger of siding with private trusts in his handling of water power issues.

In his opening speech at the congress, chairman George E. Barstow urged the government to find work for (overseas) immigrants "out West", to provide them with transportation and to lend them money to establish homes.

1910 The 1910 conference in Pueblo, Colorado, was highlighted by a dispute over whether water policy should be in the hands of the federal government or, as sought by congress chairman Frank C. Goudy of Denver, "larger private and State holdings in irrigation projects." The congress endorsed federal control of interstate water "by a substantial majority."

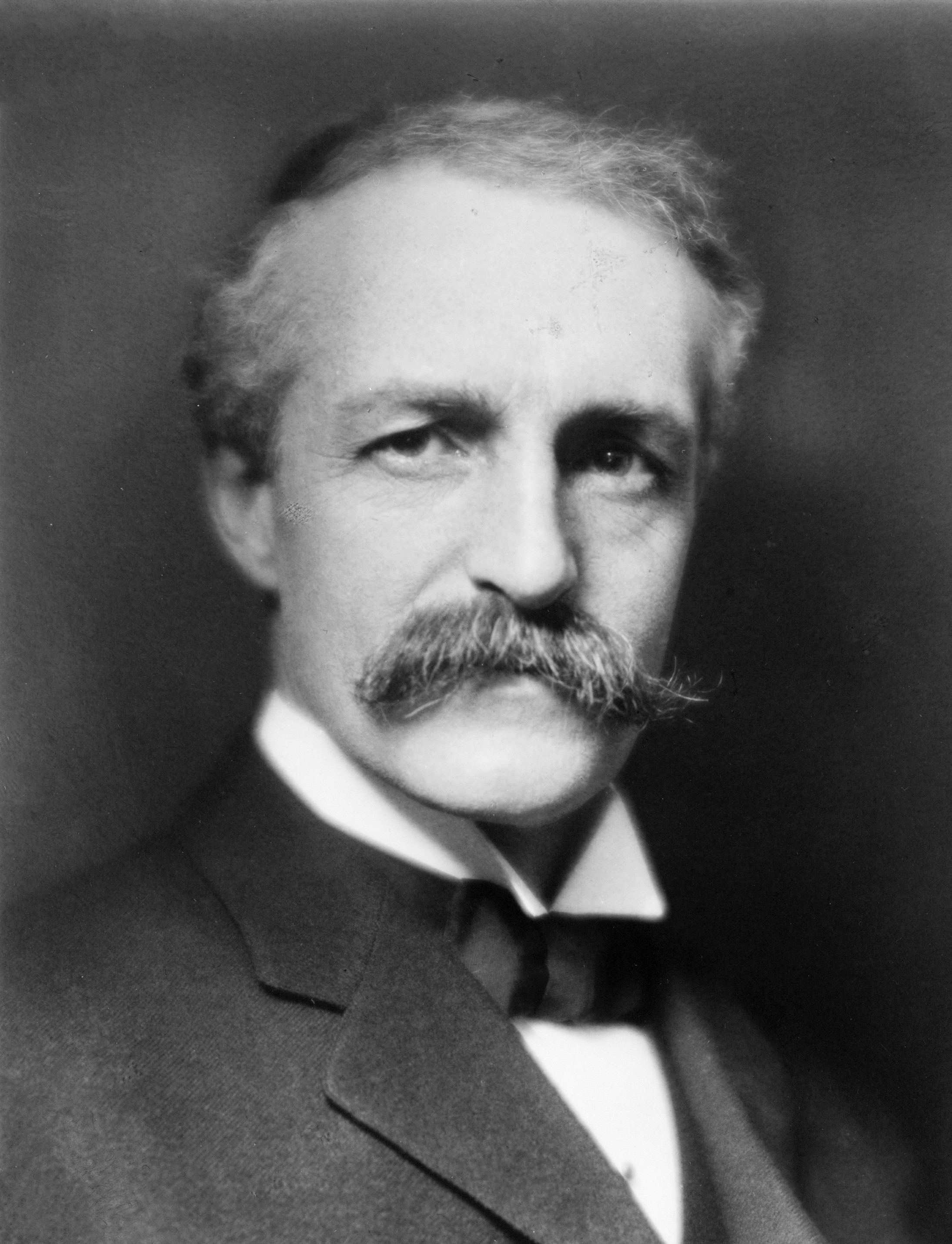
Gifford Pinchot

1911 At the Chicago, Illinois meeting, a move was afoot to change the name of the organization to National Reclamation Congress and "make the reclaiming of the swamp and lowlands of the South the primary object and the irrigation of the Southwest and the West a secondary matter." The attempt was not carried out. At one session, Gifford Pinchot, "President Roosevelt's right-hand man and former chief of the government forestry service" was verbally attacked "and his widely heralded policy of conservation was declared to be 'fantastic.'" The congress split into two factions over the matter.

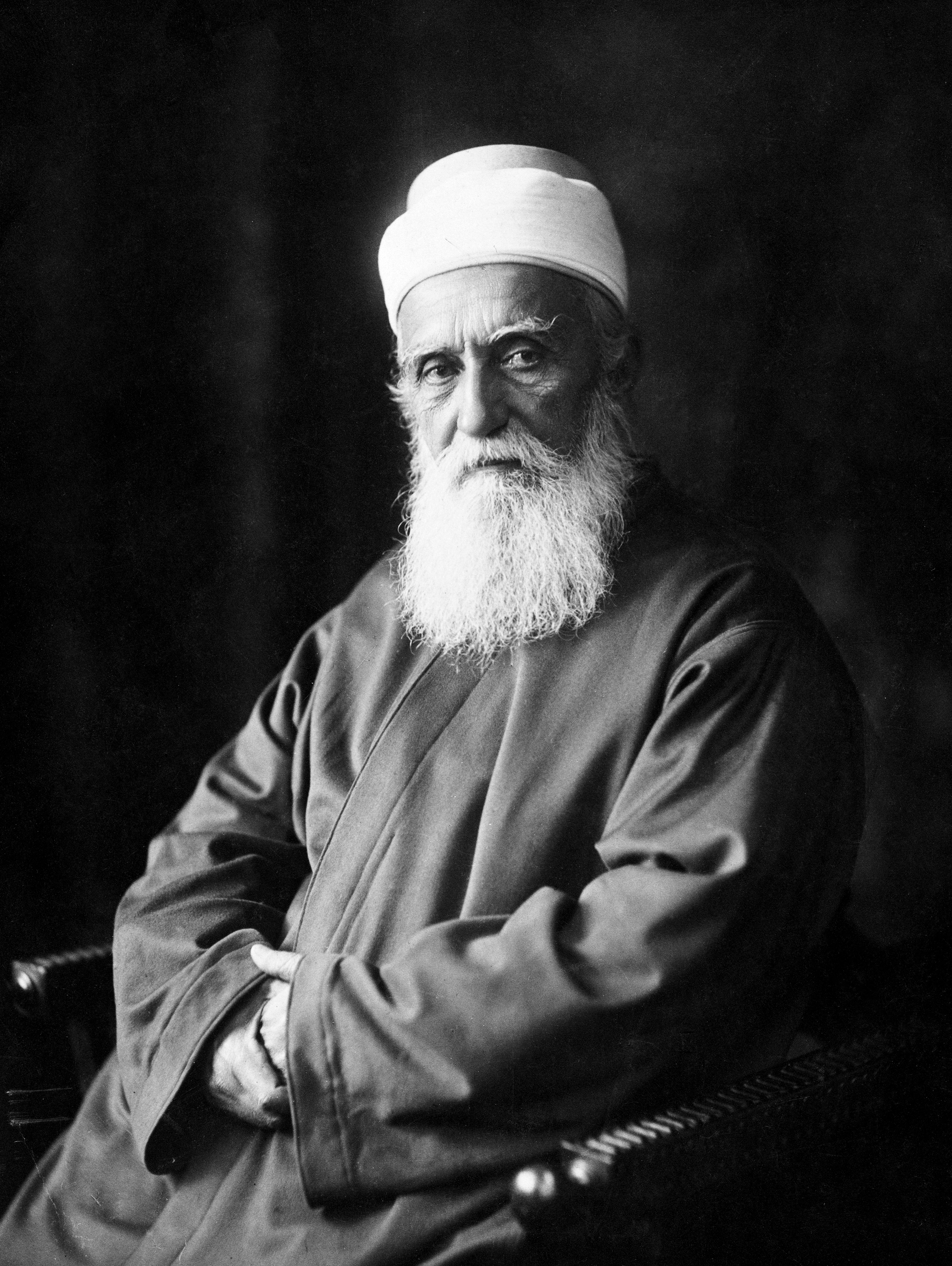
`Abdu'l-Bahá

1912 The session in Salt Lake City, Utah had on the agenda such items as "Irrigation of the Great West," "Storing of the Floods" and "Heeding the Call of the Landless Man for the Manless Land." The congress saw a change in name to International Irrigation Congress and ended with a resolution favoring control of water resources by the federal government, and not by the states. Henry S. Graves, United States forester, who gave the principal address, favored the latter proposal.

In attendance was `Abdu'l-Bahá, eldest son and chosen successor of Bahá'u'lláh, the founder of the Bahá'í Faith, during his historic journey to the west to spread the Bahá'í teachings. He was invited to be seated on the stage as an honorary guest.

1914 The regular meeting of the Irrigation Congress was scheduled for Calgary, Alberta, Canada, October 5 through 9 with more than 8,000 people attending the closing session. (In April a Trans-Missouri Irrigation Conference, not affiliated with the ongoing organization, had been held in Denver, Colorado, at the call of Secretary of the Interior Franklin Knight Lane, who had "issued a broad invitation to all persons interested in irrigation," with the meetings "open to all.")

1915 The congress was held at four locations in Northern California September 12 through 20: Stockton, Fresno, Sacramento and San Francisco.

1916

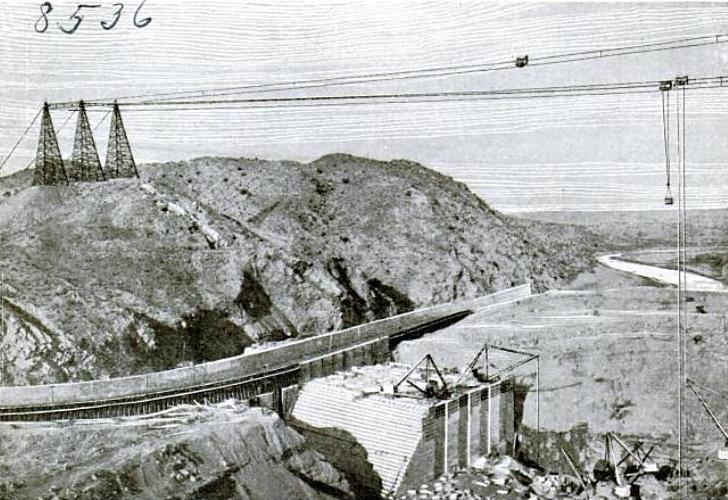
Elephant Butte Dam under construction

The twenty-third and last irrigation congress, in El Paso, Texas, was highlighted by the dedication of the new Elephant Butte Dam in Elephant Butte, New Mexico, on October 15. One evening featured a debate on whether irrigation should be a governmental or private enterprise, with Will R. King, chief counsel for the U.S. Reclamation Service, arguing for the former and Judge Carroll R. Graves of Seattle, Washington, saying that "private exploitation would give better results." At the same congress, William E. Smythe, of San Francisco, known as the "father" of the congress, proposed that a temple be erected as a memorial to the work of the irrigation pioneers.

== People associated with the congress ==
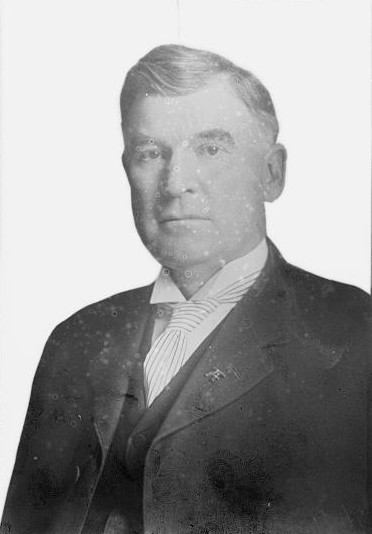
Brady

- Fred Lind Alles, secretary of the congress's national executive committee between 1893 and 1895.
- James H. Brady, Idaho governor, vice president of the congress from 1896 to 1898 and a member of its executive committee from 1900 until 1904 and vice president again from 1904 to 1908
- George Eames Barstow, financier, chairman of the congress's Pan-American committee and president of the congress in 1908–09
- Richard Fenner Burges, president of the International Irrigation Congress in 1915
- Joseph M. Carey of Cheyenne, Wyoming, congress president in 1897

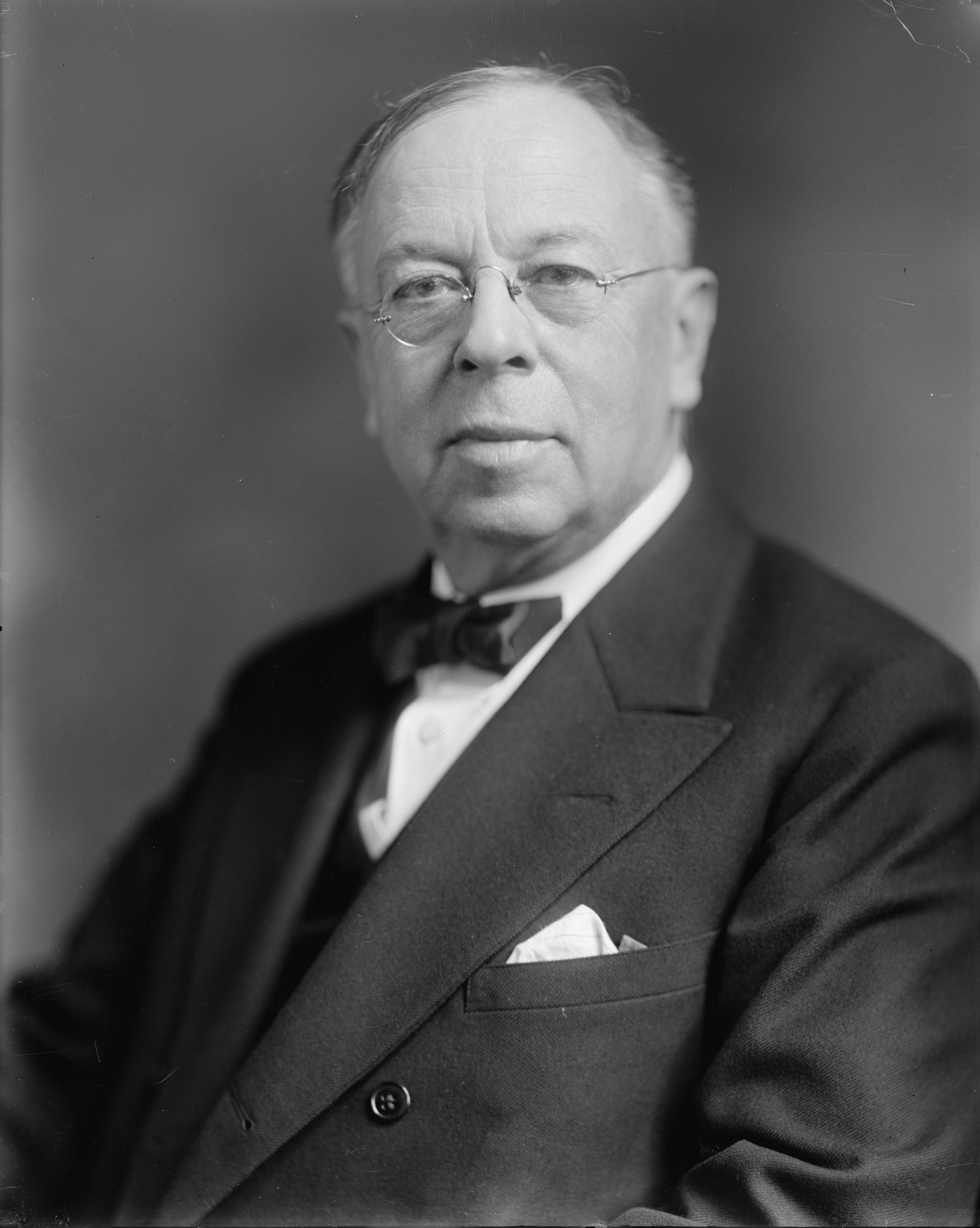
Chamberlain

- Governor George E. Chamberlain of Oregon, congress president in 1906
- Israel L. Diesem, president of the Kansas State Board of Agriculture, who "attended nearly half of the annual sessions of the National Irrigation Congress since its inception"
- B.A. Fowler of Phoenix, Arizona, president in 1909–1910
- Frank C. Goudy of Denver, Colorado, president 1907–1908
- F. Robert Insinger of Spokane, Washington, chairman of the board of the congress held in that city in 1910
- Herbert Burdell Maxson of Nevada and California, who served for eight years as congress secretary.

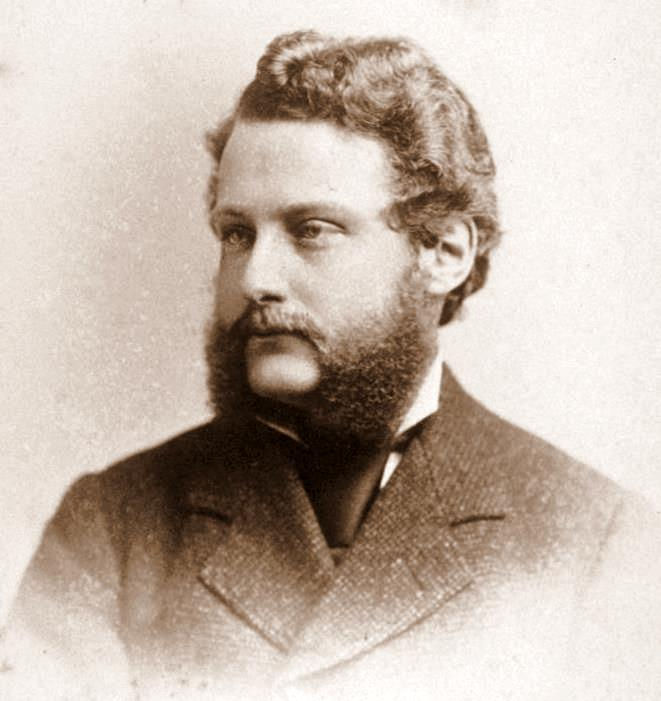
Pardee

- James H. McClintock, Arizona member of the executive committee and secretary
- Senator Francis G. Newlands of Nevada, president in 1911–12
- California Governor George C. Pardee, two-term president of the congress
- Nevada Senator William Stewart, who helped start the organization
- New Mexico State Senator George W. Swink, active in promoting the sugar-beet industry.
- Ralph E. Twitchell, a mayor of Santa Fe, New Mexico, who helped organize the first irrigation congress.
