= Barstow, Texas =

City in Ward County, Texas, United States

- City
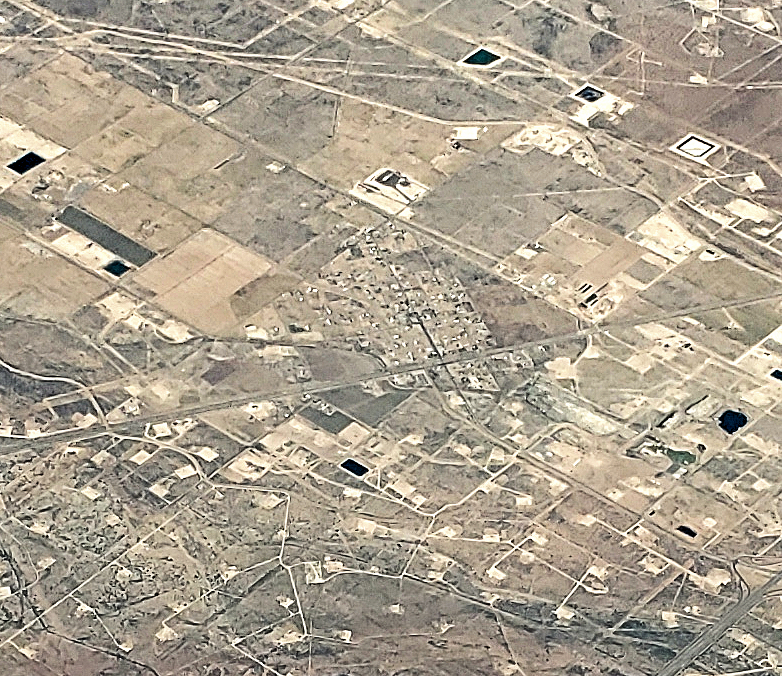
- Aerial view of Barstow
- Interactive map of Barstow, Texas
- Coordinates: 31°27′45″N 103°23′44″W
- Country: United States
- State: Texas
- County: Ward

Government
  - Mayor: Olga M. Abila

Area
  - Total: 0.66 sq mi (1.70 km^{2})
  - Land: 0.66 sq mi (1.70 km^{2})
  - Water: 0 sq mi (0.00 km^{2})
- Elevation: 2,566 ft (782 m)

Population (2020)
  - Total: 265
  - Density: 403.7/sq mi (155.88/km^{2})
- Time zone: UTC-6 (Central (CST))
  - Summer (DST): UTC-5 (CDT)
- ZIP code: 79719
- Area code: 432
- FIPS code: 48-05720
- GNIS feature ID: 1351550
- Website: cityofbarstowtx.org

Barstow is a city in Ward County, Texas, United States. Its population was 265 at the 2020 census.

== History ==
Barstow was organized in 1892 by George E. Barstow, who was one of the world's leading experts on irrigation. The same year, Barstow was elected First Ward County Seat. A courthouse was built the following year, and by 1900, the city's population was over 1,000 due to the recruiting efforts of Mr. Barstow. Irrigation was successful enough that in the 1904 World's Fair, Barstow managed to win a Silver Medal for its grapes. That same year, fruit and vegetable farming was hit hard when the Pecos River Dam broke. After that droughts followed and by 1918, farming was impossible. The town's population in 1930 was 468, less than half of the 1910s figure of 1,219.

== Geography ==
Barstow is located at 31°27′45″N 103°23′44″W (31.462523, –103.395426).

According to the United States Census Bureau, the city has a total area of 0.7 square mile (1.7 km^{2}), all land.

== Demographics ==
Historical population
Census	Pop.	Note	%±
1920	490		—
1930	468		−4.5%
1940	558		19.2%
1950	683		22.4%
1960	707		3.5%
1970	614		−13.2%
1980	637		3.7%
1990	535		−16.0%
2000	406		−24.1%
2010	349		−14.0%
2020	265		−24.1%

=== 2020 census ===
As of the 2020 census, Barstow had a population of 265 across 100 households, 88 of which were families residing in the city.

The median age was 40.5 years, with 25.3% of residents under the age of 18 and 22.3% of residents 65 years of age or older. For every 100 females there were 100.8 males, and for every 100 females age 18 and over there were 108.4 males age 18 and over.

0% of residents lived in urban areas, while 100.0% lived in rural areas.

Of the households, 37.0% had children under the age of 18 living in them, 40.0% were married-couple households, 30.0% were households with a male householder and no spouse or partner present, and 24.0% were households with a female householder and no spouse or partner present. About 30.0% of all households were made up of individuals and 10.0% had someone living alone who was 65 years of age or older.

There were 126 housing units, of which 20.6% were vacant. Among occupied housing units, 89.0% were owner-occupied and 11.0% were renter-occupied. The homeowner vacancy rate was <0.1% and the rental vacancy rate was 7.1%.

Racial composition as of the 2020 census
Race	Percent
White	32.5%
Black or African American	1.5%
American Indian and Alaska Native	3.4%
Asian	0%
Native Hawaiian and Other Pacific Islander	0%
Some other race	33.6%
Two or more races	29.1%
Hispanic or Latino (of any race)	86.0%

=== 2000 census ===
As of the census of 2000, 406 people, 146 households, and 108 families resided in the city. The population density was 607.3 inhabitants per square mile (234.5/km^{2}). The 175 housing units had an average density of 261.8 per square mile (101.1/km^{2}). The racial makeup of the city was 77.09% White, 0.25% African American, 0.25% Asian, 21.43% from other races, and 0.99% from two or more races. Hispanics or Latino of any race were 78.08% of the population.

Of the 146 households, 28.8% had children under 18 living with them, 57.5% were married couples living together, 12.3% had a female householder with no husband present, and 26.0% were not families. About 25.3% of all households were made up of individuals, and 17.8% had someone living alone who was 65 or older. The average household size was 2.78 and the average family size was 3.37.

In the city, the age distribution was 29.3% under 18, 6.4% from 18 to 24, 18.7% from 25 to 44, 23.2% from 45 to 64, and 22.4% who were 65 or older. The median age was 40 years. For every 100 females, there were 114.8 males. For every 100 females 18 and over, there were 100.7 males.

The median income for a household in the city was $15,000 and for a family was $23,333. Males had a median income of $25,833 versus $12,500 for females. The per capita income for the city was $7,642. About 41.7% of families and 39.2% of the population were below the poverty line, including 50.0% of those under 18 and 34.7% of those 65 or over.

== Education ==
The City of Barstow is served by the Pecos-Barstow-Toyah Independent School District.

== See also ==
- List of municipalities in Texas
