= Benson Ginsburg =

American geneticist

- Born: Benson Earl Ginsburg; July 16, 1918; Detroit, Michigan
- Died: August 17, 2016 (aged 98); Storrs, Connecticut
- Education: Wayne State University; University of Chicago
- Spouse: Pearl Miner (m. 1941; died 1998)
- Children: Faye Ginsburg; Judy Meyer; Deborah Szajnberg
- Awards: University of Chicago Quantrell Award (twice); 1980 Dobzhansky Memorial Award from the Behavior Genetics Association
- Scientific career
- Fields: Behavior genetics
- Institutions: University of Chicago; University of Connecticut
- Thesis: The Effects of the Major Gene Controlling Coat Color in the Guinea Pig on DOPA Oxidase Activity in Skin Extracts (1943)
- Doctoral advisor: Sewall Wright
- Doctoral students: Kevin B. MacDonald; Stephen Maxson

Benson Earl Ginsburg (July 16, 1918 – August 17, 2016) was an American behavioral geneticist who taught at the University of Chicago and the University of Connecticut. He was a co-founder of the Behavior Genetics Association.

== Early life and education ==
Ginsburg was born on July 16, 1918, in Detroit, Michigan. His parents, Sonia and Morris Ginsburg, were both recently arrived Jewish immigrants from Russia. He received his undergraduate education at Wayne State University, where he was originally a journalism major, before switching to majoring in English, and then becoming a biology major in the second semester of his junior year. He graduated from Wayne State cum laude in 1939, and received his master's degree from there in 1941. He then enrolled in a summer class in zoology at the University of Chicago, where he received his Ph.D. in 1943 under the supervision of Sewall Wright.

== Career ==
Ginsburg joined the faculty of the University of Chicago in 1946, where he helped develop an undergraduate natural science program, of which he was later the chair. Also in 1946, he and his family began taking summer trips to Bar Harbor, Maine, and he began conducting research at the Jackson Laboratory in mice and rabbits. He continued to conduct research at the Jackson Laboratory every summer until the 1980s. In 1963, he was appointed the William Rainey Harper Professor of Biology at the University of Chicago, a position he held until leaving the university's faculty in 1968. That year, he joined the faculty of the University of Connecticut, where he co-founded the Department of Biobehavioral Sciences in 1969. He headed this department from 1969 to 1985. He played a major role in founding the Behavior Genetics Association, and hosted its first meeting on the University of Connecticut's campus in 1971. He retired from the University of Connecticut in 1997, after which he became an emeritus professor there; he remained an active researcher even after his retirement.

== Research ==
Ginsburg conducted research in many different animal species, including fruit flies, dogs, mice, and humans. Early in his career, while at the University of Chicago, he began researching the behavior genetics of mice before moving to research coyotes and subsequently wolves. His initial goal was to breed wolves that did not display the aggressive behavior characteristic of their wild counterparts. He subsequently continued this research at the University of Connecticut, where he started the Wolf Project in a protected enclosure on the university's campus. This nine-year project aimed, among other things, to assess the behavioral factors that underlie mating dynamics in wolves.

== Honors and awards ==
Ginsburg was a two-time fellow of the Center for Advanced Study in the Behavioral Sciences: once in 1956 and once in 1965. He was also a fellow of the American Association for the Advancement of Science, the American Psychological Society, the Animal Behavior Society, and the International Society for Research on Aggression. In 1980, he received the Dobzhansky Memorial Award from the Behavior Genetics Association. In 2001, he received the International Behavioral and Neural Genetics Society's Award for pioneering and continuing contributions to the field. He received the Quantrell Award.

== Personal life and death ==
Ginsburg married Pearl on August 29, 1941; they were married until her death in 1998. They had three children: Judy, Deborah, and Faye. Benson Ginsburg died on August 17, 2016, in Storrs, Connecticut, at the age of 98.
