= Maxon =

Maxon may refer to:

== People ==
- Bonnie Maxon (born 1981), American professional wrestler
- Bradley Maxon Hamlett (fl. from 2009), American politician
- Carey Maxon (born 1978), American artist
- Densmore Maxon (1820–1887), American farmer and politician
- Eric Maxon (1882–1963), British actor
- James M. Maxon (1875–1948), American Episcopal bishop
- Joseph S. Maxon (1838–?), American politician
- Ruth Maxon Adams (1883–1970), American architect
- William Ralph Maxon (1877–1948), American botanist
- Maxon Crumb (born 1945), American artist
- Maxon S. Lough (1886–1964), American brigadier general
- Maxon Margiela (2004-2025), American rapper

== Other uses ==
- Maxon Computer GmbH, a German software company that produces Cinema 4D
- Maxon Effects, a line of effects pedals for guitar and bass
- Maxon excitation, in superfluid helium-4
- Maxon Group, a Swiss manufacturer of high-precision drive systems
- Maxon Telecom Co Ltd, a South Korean manufacturer of mobile phones and telecommunication devices
- George John Maxon, a fictional character using the identity of Red Skull

== See also ==
- Maxson (disambiguation)
