= Faye Ginsburg =

American anthropologist (born 1952)

Faye Ginsburg (born October 28, 1952) is an American anthropologist. She has published ethnographies about her fieldwork experiences in the U.S., Canada and Australia. Currently, she is an anthropology professor at New York University and the director of the Center for Media, Culture and History at NYU. She is also the cofounder, with Mara Mills, of the NYU Center for Disability Studies.

== Early life and education ==
Faye Ginsburg was born on October 28, 1952, in Chicago, Illinois to parents Benson Ginsburg and Pearl Miner. Her father was a behavioral geneticist at the University of Chicago.

Ginsburg graduated from Barnard College in 1976 with a BA, and from City University of New York, with a Ph.D. in 1986.

== Publications ==
Ginsburg is the editor of Contested Lives: The Abortion Debate in an American Community. In this book the author talks about the Fargo Women's Health Organization. The Fargo Women's Health Organization was the first facility to offer abortions publicly in North Dakota. Ginsburg discusses the pro-choice and pro-life movement's evolution in North Dakota and furthermore, the United States.

Ginsburg also published Media Worlds: Anthropology on New Terrain with Lila Abu-Lughod and Brian Larkin. The twenty chapters in Media Worlds "treat materials from local and disaporic communities worldwide and discusses sites of production and consumption. The chapters in the book talk about different technologies utilized by other cultures. Ginsburg focuses on aborigines in Australia and the individuals residing in the Baffin Islands, Canada.

== Personal life ==
Ginsburg lives in New York with her husband Fred Myers, who is also an anthropologist.

=== Other publications ===
- Uncertain Terms: Negotiating Gender in American Culture.
- 9/11 and After, A Virtual Case Book.
- Conceiving the New World Order: The Global Politics of Reproduction.

==== Publications in progress ====
- Mediating Culture: Indigenous Identity in a Digital Age.
- Disability, Personhood, and the New Normal in 21st Century America

== Awards ==
- 1994 MacArthur Fellows Program
- 2004 Council on Anthropology and Reproduction Edited Volume Prize,
- American Sociological Association's Sociology of Culture Book Award.
- Society for Medical Anthropology's Basket Award for Research on Gender and Health.
