= Richard Fenner Burges =

American politician

Burges

Richard Fenner Burges (January 7, 1873 – January 13, 1945) was an American attorney, legislator and conservationist.

== Biography ==
Burges was born on January 7, 1873, in Seguin, Texas, the son of William H. Burges Sr., an attorney, and Bettie Rust. His mother died six days after he was born, and he was raised by his father, his grandmother and his aunt, Nannie.

He was privately tutored until the eighth grade, when he began studying with a German professor. He attended the Agricultural and Mechanical College of Texas for a year, "where he excelled in rhetoric and oration."

In 1898, he was married to Ethel Petrie Shelton, and they had a daughter, Jane (later Perrenot). He died in El Paso on January 13, 1945. His home at 603 West Yandell, was donated by his daughter to the El Paso County Historical Society in 1986. His vast collection of "books, correspondence, photographs, scrapbook, articles, historical paper and other documents" can be examined there. A branch of the city's public library is named in his honor.

== Legal career ==
Burges read law in the offices of his father in Seguin and of J.D. Guinn in New Braunfels and was admitted to the bar in 1894.

In 1904, Burges took part in a "so-called 'clean up' of El Paso" and became city attorney there from 1905 to 1907 under Mayor Charles Davis, and in 1907, he wrote a city charter that established a commission form of government in that city. In 1910–11 he was associate counsel for the United States in the arbitration of the Chamizal dispute with Mexico and, in 1915 the counsel for the El Paso County Water Improvement District. where he helped in the construction of the Elephant Butte irrigation project.

He was also a special counsel for the Texas-Rio Grande Compact Commission and from 1935 to 1940, he was a special attorney for the United States Department of Justice in negotiations with Mexico for a Rio Grande rectification project.

== Politics ==
Burges was a member of the Texas House of Representatives from 1913 to 1915 and "wrote or influenced the passing of the Texas Irrigation Code, the royalty mining act, a forestry act, a married woman's property act, and a compulsory-education act." He also co-authored the Burges-Glasscock Act, which stated, among other things, that "all unappropriated waters in this state, not simply those in arid West Texas, were the property of the state."

== Military ==
In June 1917, after the entry of United States involvement in World War II, Burges organized Company B of the Texas National Guard, which was incorporated into the Army's 36th Infantry Division as Company A of the 141st Infantry. He commanded the battalion in the Battle of the Argonne and was awarded a Croix de Guerre by the French government after he and a sergeant, Sam Dreben, "made a dash into enemy territory and captured six machine guns and killed 21 German soldiers." Dreben was awarded a U.S. Distinguished Service Cross. He entered the war as a captain and left as a major.

== Volunteer work ==
Burges was president of the International Irrigation Congress in 1915–16, and from 1921 to 1923 he was president of the Texas Forestry Association. As a member of the American Forestry Association, he promoted the development of Carlsbad Caverns as a national park.

He was a board member of the El Paso Public Library, the Texas Historical Commission and the Texas History and Library Commission.

== Publications ==
- "Rare Beauties to the Found in the Wonderful Carlsbad Caverns," El Paso Times, August 26, 1923.
