= Fred Lind Alles =

American businessman and civic leader (1851-1945)

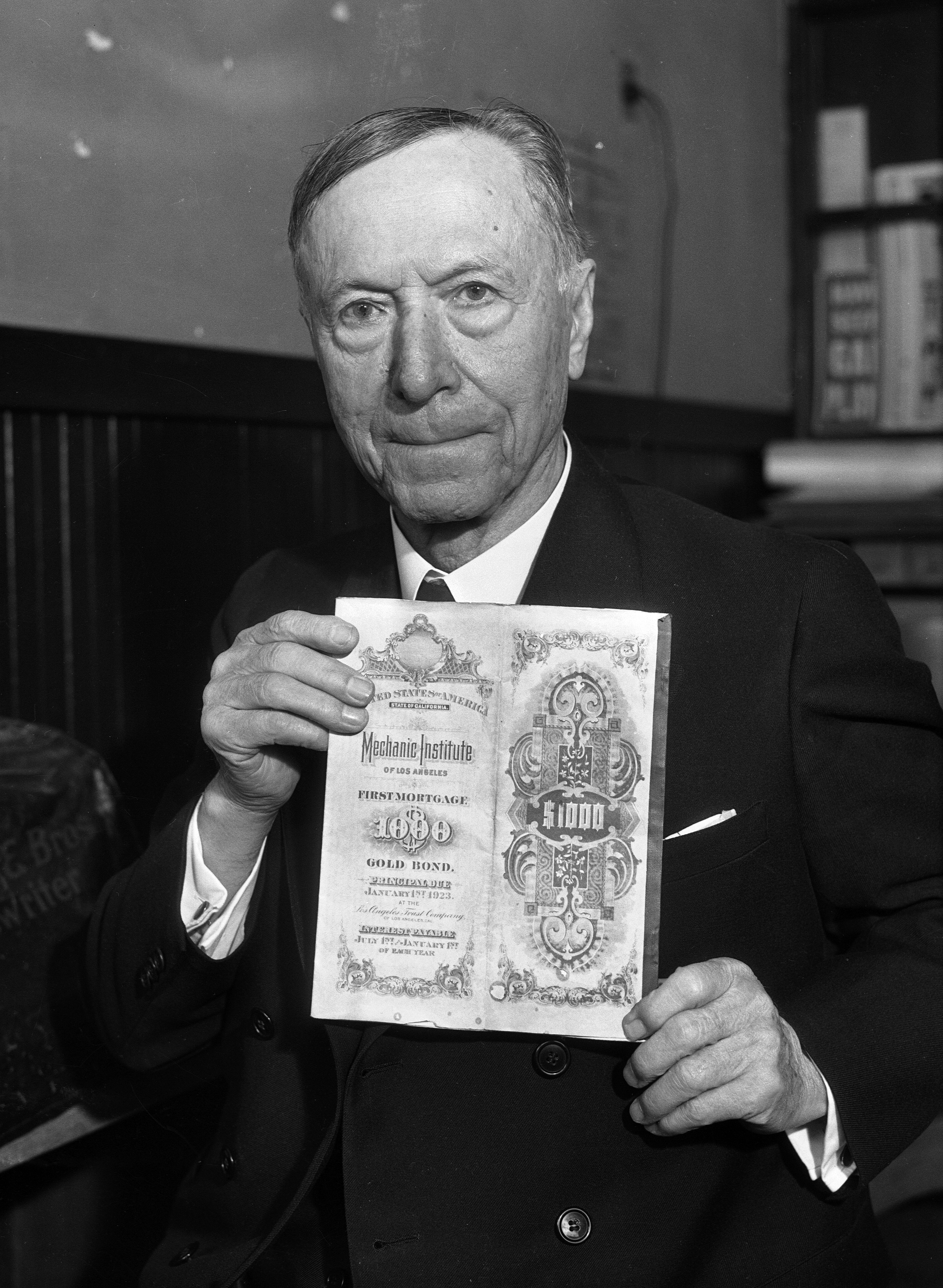
- Fred Lind Alles in 1936, holding a bond of $1,000 from the Mechanics Institute of Los Angeles
- Born: August 2, 1851; Pittsburgh, Pennsylvania, U.S.
- Died: March 7, 1945 (aged 93); Los Angeles, California, U.S.
- Occupation(s): Businessman, civic leader
- Spouse: Mary Elizabeth Allen
- Children: Allen Alles, Clara Lavinia Greaves, Lind Chesley Alles

Fred Lind Alles (August 2, 1851 – March 7, 1945) was a businessman and civic leader in Los Angeles, California, during the late 19th and early 20th centuries, serving as secretary or other officer for various committees and for the National Irrigation Congress.

== Professional life ==
Lind was born in Pittsburgh, Pennsylvania, on August 2, 1851, and attended the public schools of Pitt Township between 1857 and 1861. He entered the printing business as a "kid press feeder" with the Pittsburgh Post at age about 13 in 1864, followed by stints at the Pittsburgh Dispatch and the Workingman's Advocate, also in Pittsburgh.

He moved to Chicago in 1868, where he was an office worker at the Religio-Philosophical Journal, being then promoted to foreman and writer. During this time, he attended a public school in Saint Charles, Illinois. He moved in 1872 to Sparta, Illinois, where he was the publisher of the Sparta Plain Dealer. In 1874 he was the editor of the Belleville, Illinois, Advocate, and he worked for the Sentinel in Pontiac, Illinois, from 1875 to 1883.

Lind moved to Ontario, California, in 1883, where he was president of the San Antonio Water Company in 1884 and 1885. Between 1884 and 1888 he was the publisher of Rural Californian magazine. In 1887, to recover his health, he made a trip to Alaska, accompanied by Senators George Graham Vest of Missouri, Charles B. Farwell of Illinois and J. Donald Cameron of Pennsylvania, and returned "weighing fourteen pounds more than when I started."

In 1889 he became temporary managing editor of the Riverside Press and Horticulturalist, but the next year he sold his Riverside County orange grove and moved back to Los Angeles, where he became secretary and general manager of the Los Angeles Printing Company between 1890 and 1902. In 1890, a strike by printers

paralyzed the composing rooms of all the Los Angeles newspapers. Alles rounded up his print shop employees and dashed to the rescue, taking personal charge of the composing room of The Times and putting two of his foremen in charge of printing The Tribune and the Herald. One of his proudest possessions [in 1941] is a letter from Gen. Harrison Gray Otis thanking him for his efforts, "without which it would have been necessary for The Times to temporarily suspend publication.

In March 1897 he became business manager of the Los Angeles Express, and in 1901 he established his own printing business, which he maintained until 1905.

Alles was honored in January 1941 for his life's work when a portrait of him by artist Arthur Cahill was unveiled in Los Angeles's prestigious California Club.

== Volunteer work ==
Lind volunteered as an officer or member of many nonprofit organizations. They included:

- Illinois Press Association between 1877 and 1883, secretary
- Pomological Society, Los Angeles, secretary, 1885
- Illinois Society of Los Angeles, secretary, 1886
- Los Angeles Fair Committee, secretary, 1887
- National Irrigation Congress, secretary, between 1893 and 1895
- La Fiesta Association in Los Angeles, organizer of an annual parade and fiesta, vice president, 1896 and 1897
- Los Angeles Chamber of Commerce, director, 1897
- Mechanics Institute in Los Angeles, director and secretary, from 1902 to 1923.
- Sunset Club of Los Angeles, secretary, for which he wrote The Sunset Club: A History in 1905.

By 1889 Alles had become commissioner of immigration for the Southern California Immigration Association and made a four-month trip to Illinois, Kansas, Missouri, Michigan, Pennsylvania and West Virginia that year. On his return, he was quoted as saying:

Everywhere I found people interested in . . . Southern California, and all were anxious to obtain some reliable information about our soil, our climate, our resources and our future prospects. . . . The impression that this is only a country for rich men is everywhere present, and people were surprised on being told that we have an abundance of cheap lands which can be profitably worked by men of ordinary intelligence possessed of muscle which they are not afraid to use.

In September 1889, Alles began circulating a petition to change the name of Fort Street in downtown Los Angeles to Broadway southward between First and Tenth Streets and to North Broadway northward of First Street, At first the petition "received but little encouragement," the Los Angeles Times reported, "as Fort Street is one of the oldest landmarks in Los Angeles, and the impression seemed to prevail that the name should not be blotted out," but eventually the argument that "Fort Street" sounded too much like "Fourth Street" prevailed, and the name changes were adopted.

Controversy enveloped Alles in 1895 when C.M. Heintz, his successor as secretary of the National Irrigation Congress, accused Alles of falsely claiming that the congress in Albuquerque, New Mexico, had voted to thank both Alles and congress chairman William E. Smythe for their service after they had announced they would not seek re-election to their seats. Alles was defended editorially in articles in both the Times and the Los Angeles Herald.

== Personal life ==
Lind was born August 2, 1851, in Pittsburgh, Pennsylvania, to Henry Alles or Alois and Elizabeth Kaufman. In his later years, he recalled that he once sat on a streetcar seat next to former president Martin Van Buren, who died in 1862, when Alles was about seven. He was married to Mary Elizabeth Allen in Sparta, Illinois, on December 4, 1873, in a double wedding with Mary's sister, Avis. Lind and Mary Elizabeth had three children, Allen Alles, Clara Lavinia Greaves and Lind Chesley Alles. Mary Elizabeth died on July 23, 1923, at the age of 73.

Alles died March 7, 1945, at the age of 93. He was buried at Forest Lawn Memorial Park.
