= All =

All or ALL may refer to:

== Biology and medicine ==
- Acute lymphoblastic leukemia, a cancer
- Anterolateral ligament, a ligament in the knee
- Carlo Allioni (1728–1804), Italian physician and professor of botany (taxonomic author abbreviation "All.")

== Language ==
- All, an indefinite pronoun in English
- All, one of the English determiners
- Allar language of Kerala, India (ISO 639-3 code)
- Allative case (abbreviated ALL)

== Music ==
- All (band), an American punk rock band
  - All (All album), 1999
- All (Descendents album) or the title song, 1987
- All (Horace Silver album) or the title song, 1972
- All (Yann Tiersen album), 2019
- "All" (song), by Patricia Bredin, representing the UK at Eurovision 1957
- "All (I Ever Want)", a song by Alexander Klaws, 2005
- "All", a song by Collective Soul from Hints Allegations and Things Left Unsaid, 1994

== Sports ==
- All (tennis)
- American Lacrosse League (1988)
- Arena Lacrosse League, Canada
- Australian Lacrosse League

== Other uses ==
- All, Missouri, a community in the US
- All, a brand of Sun Products
- Albanian lek by ISO 4217 currency code
- ALL (complexity), the class of all decision problems in computability and complexity theory
- ALL, a content rating given by the Game Rating and Administration Committee in South Korea

== See also ==
- Awl (disambiguation)
- Alle (disambiguation)
- Allyl group
- "For all", a universal quantification in predicate logic, represented by ∀
