= George E. Barstow =

American politician (1849-1924)

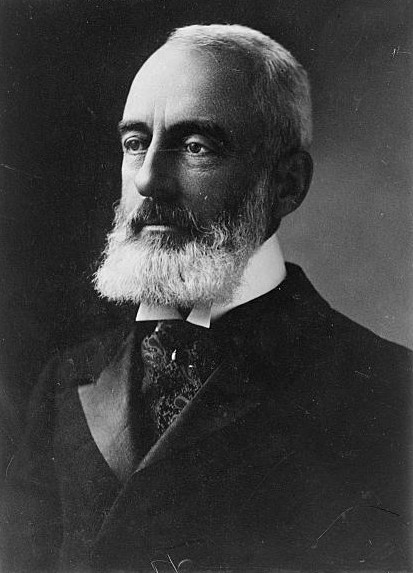

Member of the Rhode Island House of Representatives
- In office 1894–1896

Personal details
- Born: George Eames Barstow; November 19, 1849 Providence, Rhode Island
- Died: April 30, 1924 (aged 74) Barstow, Texas
- Spouse: Clara Drew Symonds (m. 1871)
- Children: 9
- Occupation: Businessman, politician

George Eames Barstow (November 19, 1849 – April 30, 1924), described as a "capitalist and irrigation pioneer", was a Texas land developer and a member of both the Providence, Rhode Island, common council (four years) and the city's school board (14 years), as well as the Rhode Island State Assembly from 1894 to 1896. He was known as "the father of irrigation in the Southwest".

== Business career ==
Barstow began his business career at the age of 17 and eventually "founded, financed, or organized" five worsted and paper mills in Rhode Island.

He then turned his attention to the Pecos Valley in Texas, where the Pioneer Canal Company was chartered on September 30, 1889, with Barstow as treasurer. He later served as president of a successor company, the Pecos Valley Land and Irrigation Company.

In 1891, Barstow and other land developers formed a project to promote a town on the Texas and Pacific Railway in western Ward County, Texas. By 1895, the town had taken on the name of Barstow, and Barstow himself moved there from New York City in 1904. He took part in organizing other irrigation and drainage systems through the West.

== Volunteer work ==
Barstow, a Republican, wrote pamphlets on varied subjects, including immigration, cooperatives, China-Japan relations, and Americanism.

=== Irrigation and immigration ===
In 1908–9, Barstow was the president of the National Irrigation Congress, the leading organization interested in water projects in the West, and he was in charge of the annual convention in 1909 in Spokane, Washington. A Los Angeles Times reporter wrote about the impending congress that Barstow "has been a prime mover in inducing the federal government to build the systems that will make fertile over 3,000,000 acres of land which once was a desert." In an interview, Barstow predicted that isolated farmhouses would become "a thing of the past" and that farmers would commute from their homes to farms via fast horses or automobiles or interurban streetcars. He added:

The government is laying out towns every five miles. . . . The farms will be small, ten to forty acres, and the farming intensive. Under these circumstances, the farmers will live in towns of 1500 to 2000 people, enjoying all the benefits of urban life — schools, churches and social life. . . . A tide from the city to the country has already set in. Many college graduates have chosen farming on irrigated tracts for their life work.

In his opening speech at the Spokane congress, Barstow urged the government to find work for (overseas) immigrants "out West," to provide them with transportation and to lend them money to establish homes. He asked:

Shall I, who have always been broadly conservative, be regarded as preaching paternalism or as socialistic in my purpose when suggesting that the duty of the National Government may be found in providing under proper safeguard a fund which may be used to make loans of suitable amount to enable this thrifty and frugal class of people to locate their homes . . . ?

Barstow was head of the National Immigration Commission in 1912, and he sent a message to the first convention of the American Immigration and Distribution League in New York City in April of that year "stating that 65 per cent. of the immigrants who came to the country were farm laborers, and that the United States Government ought to establish an Immigrant Land Loan Fund, which would advance small sums to immigrants who settled on Western lands."

=== Offices and memberships ===
- President, National Drainage Congress, 1907–08
- President, eleventh International Irrigation Congress, 1908–09
- Vice president, Texas Conservation Commission
- President, West Texas Reclamation Association
- Member, Conference of Governors, 1908
- Delegate, World Court Congress, Cleveland, 1915
- Life director, Euphrates College, Turkey
- Fellow, Royal Society of Arts, London
- Councilor, World's Purity Congress
- Member and fellow, Society of Applied Psychology, San Francisco
- Member, committee on conferences, American Agricultural Association
- Member, advisory committee of the University Forum, New York
- Member, American Society of International Law
- Member, National Institute of Social Sciences
- Member, Southern Sociological Congress
- Member, National Child Labor Committee
- Member, National Civic Federation
- Member, American Institute of Civics
- Member, Academy of Political Science
- Member, American Society of Judicial Settlement of International Disputes
- Member, International Peace Forum
- Member, League to Enforce Peace
- Member, International World Conscience Society, Rome
- Member, Navy League
- Member, Rhode Island Historical Society
- Member, Empire State Society of the Sons of the American Revolution
- Member, Pennsylvania Academy of Fine Arts
- Member, New York Museum of Natural History

== Personal life ==
Barstow was born on November 19, 1849, in Providence, the son of Amos Chafee, a manufacturer, banker, and one of the most prominent men in the city, and Emeline (Mumford) Eames. Young George was educated at a public school and at Mowry and Goff's Classical School in that city. He was married to Clara Drew Symonds on October 19, 1871. They had nine children — Caroline Hartwell, George Eames Jr., Herbert Symonds, Helen Louise, Harold Carleton, Marguerite, Putnam, Donald and a ninth child, John P. or Paris (the sources differ). Barstow, who attended a Congregational church in Providence and a Methodist church in Texas, died on April 30, 1924, in Barstow and was buried in Barstow Cemetery.
