= Stephen Maxson =

American geneticist

Stephen C. Maxson
- Citizenship: American
- Education: University of Chicago (S.B., 1960; Ph.D., 1966)
- Awards: 1998 Dobzhansky Award from the Behavior Genetics Association
- Scientific career
- Fields: Behavior genetics Psychology
- Workplaces: University of Connecticut
- Thesis: The effect of genotype on brain mechanisms involved in audiogenic seizure susceptibility (1966)
- Doctoral advisor: Benson E. Ginsburg

Stephen Clark Maxson is an American behavior geneticist and professor emeritus of psychology at the University of Connecticut. He first joined the faculty of the University of Connecticut in 1969 as an assistant professor. He is known for his research on the link between aggression and the Y chromosome in mice, for which he received the Dobzhansky Award from the Behavior Genetics Association in 1998.
