= Center for Disability Studies =

American institute studying disability in society

NYU Center for Disability Studies
- Founded: 2017
- Founders: Mara Mills; Faye Ginsburg
- Type: 501(c)(3) Nonprofit organization
- Location: New York, New York, U.S.
- Website: disabilitystudies.nyu.edu

The Center for Disability Studies (CDS) at New York University (NYU) is a United States-based institute that promotes disability scholarship, artistic works, and activism.

== History ==
The Center for Disability Studies was founded in 2017 by Mara Mills and Faye Ginsburg.

Shortly after its founding, the center hosted Disability/Arts/NYC (DANT), an advocacy organization that contributed to the 2017 CreateNYC cultural plan for New York City.

== Research and Publications ==
The center sponsors research on the cultural, historical, legal, and ethical contexts of disability through grant-funded and collaborative projects. Research partnerships run by the center include a collaboration between AI Now and CDS on the 2019 report, Disability, Bias, and AI.

With Film Quarterly, CDS published a special issue and series of events on disability film and media in 2022–2023. Further publications facilitated by the center include How to be Disabled in a Pandemic, an edited volume documenting the experiences of disabled New Yorkers during the COVID-19 pandemic, selected by Ms. Magazine as one of the “Most Anticipated Books of 2025”, and Crip Authorship: Disability as Method, a book that presented the multidisciplinary methods advanced by disability studies, arts, and activism. Crip Authorship was selected as a 2024 CHOICE Outstanding Academic Title.

== Community Initiatives ==
The Center for Disability Studies runs a series of artist talks and events. It has also partnered with a number of arts organizations including The Whitney Museum of American Art, Electronic Arts Intermix, The Guggenheim Museum, the Leslie-Lohman Museum of Art, EFA Project Space, and the New York ReelAbilities Film Festival to support disability-justice informed events and digital accessibility projects.

In addition, the center helped pilot the Cooke School and Institute SKILLS Transition Program through a community collaboration.

On the NYU campus, CDS coordinates an undergraduate Disability Studies Minor and co-sponsored a Disability Student Union and a Provostial Working Group addressing disability, infrastructure, and access.
