= Herbert B. Maxson =

Herbert Burdell Maxson
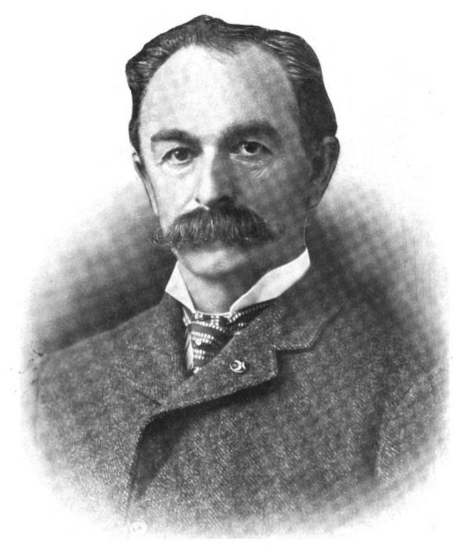
- Born: 1849 or 1850; Leonardsville, New York
- Died: January 26, 1927 (aged 77); Los Angeles, California
- Occupations: Miner, civil engineer
- Political party: Republican
- Spouse: Mollie S. Maxson

Herbert Burdell Maxson (1849/1850–1927) was a miner and civil engineer in Arizona and later deputy United States surveyor for Nevada. He was one of the pioneers of the National Irrigation Congress, a group concerned with water resources in the Western United States, serving eight years as its secretary. He also served on the Panama Canal staff.

== Biography ==
Maxson was born in Leonardsville, New York, and came to Arizona in 1870. He moved to Nevada in 1888, where he was elected county surveyor of Washoe County and was later appointed to the federal deputy surveyor post. He was a member of the Republican National Committee. He came to Los Angeles, California, about 1923 and was on the Traffic Commission and the Los Angeles Airport Committee. He was a member of the California State Republican Committee.

He was the republican candidate against incumbent democratic representative George A. Bartlett in the 1908 House of Representatives election in Nevada. He lost to Bartlett.

Maxson died January 26, 1927, at seventy-seven, leaving a widow, Mollie S. Maxson, and children H.H., E.L. and Evelyn Maxson, all of Los Angeles.
