= List of Leiodidae genera =

These 379 genera belong to the family Leiodidae, round fungus beetles. There are about 3,800 described species in Leiodidae.

== Leiodidae genera ==
Subfamily Camiarinae Jeannel, 1911
Tribe Agyrtodini Jeannel, 1936

Afropelates Jeannel, 1964
Agyrtodes Portevin, 1907
Agyrtolasia Szymczakowski, 1973
Chelagyrtodes Szymczakowski, 1973
Chiliopelates Jeannel, 1964
Cholevomorpha Blackburn, 1891
Dasypelates Portevin, 1907
Dictydiella Jeannel, 1936
Dontipelates Salgado Costas, 2015
Eupelates Portevin, 1907
Karinapelates Salgado Costas, 2015
Paragyrtodes Szymczakowski, 1966
Ragytodina Jeannel, 1957
Zeagyrtes Broun, 1917
Zeagyrtoma Szymczakowski, 1966
Zearagytodes Jeannel, 1936
†Cretagyrtodes Cai & Huang, 2017

Tribe Camiarini Jeannel, 1911

Baeosilpha Broun, 1895
Camiarites Jeannel, 1957
Camiarodes Seago, 2015
Camiarus Sharp, 1878
Camisolus Seago, 2015
Inocatops Broun, 1893
Neocamiarus Jeannel, 1957
Zenocolon Broun, 1917

Tribe Neopelatopini Jeannel, 1962

Alsobius
Capnosolius Seago & Newton, 2009
Catopsolius Sharp, 1886
Eublackburniella Jeannel, 1938
Myrmicholeva Lea, 1910
Neopelatops Jeannel, 1936
Ragytodes Jeannel, 1936
Sphaeropelatops Jeannel, 1962

Subfamily Catopocerinae Hatch, 1927
Catopocerus Motschulsky, 1870
Glacicavicola Westcott, 1968
Muganryus
Perkovskius Lafer, 1989
Pinodytes Horn, 1880
Subfamily Cholevinae Kirby, 1837
Tribe Anemadini Hatch, 1928

Subtribe Anemadina

Anemadiola Szymczakowski, 1963
Anemadus Reitter, 1884
Cholevodes Portevin, 1928
Speonemadus Jeannel, 1922

Subtribe Eocatopina

Eocatops Peyerimhoff, 1924
Neoeocatops Peck & Cook, 2007

Subtribe Eunemadina

Araucaniopsis Salgado Costas, 2005
Austrocholeva Zwick, 1979
Austronargus Zwick, 1979
Austronemadus Zwick, 1979
Catoposchema Jeannel, 1936
Dissochaetus Reitter, 1884
Eunemadus Portevin, 1914
Falkocholeva Hatch, 1928
Falkonemadus Szymczakowski, 1961
Nargiotes Jeannel, 1936
Nargomorphus Jeannel, 1936
Nemadiolus Jeannel, 1936
Nemadiopsis Jeannel, 1936
Nemadotropis Szymczakowski, 1971
Newtoniopsis Salgado Costas, 2005
Paranemadus Zwick, 1979
Peckardia Salgado Costas, 2005
Pseudonargiotes Salgado Costas, 2005
Pseudonemadus Portevin, 1914
Rangiola Jeannel, 1936

Subtribe Nemadina

Micronemadus Jeannel, 1936
Nemadus Thomson, 1867

Subtribe Paracatopina

Mesocolon Broun, 1880
Paracatops Portevin, 1907

Tribe Cholevini Kirby, 1837

Subtribe Catopina (Jeannel 1922)

Apocatops Zwick, 1968
Apterocatops Miyama, 1985
Catopidius Jeannel, 1922
Catopodes Portevin, 1914
Catops Paykull, 1798
Catoptrichus Murray, 1856
Chionocatops Ganglbauer, 1899
Cholevinus Reitter, 1901
Dreposcia Jeannel, 1922
Dzungarites Jeannel, 1936
Fissocatops Zwick, 1968
Himalops Perreau, 1986
Mesocatops Szymczakowski, 1961
Rybinskiella Reitter, 1906
Sciodrepoides Hatch, 1933

Subtribe Cholevina Kirby 1837

Attaephilus Motschoulsky, 1870
Attumbra Gozis, 1886
Catopsimorphus Aubé, 1850
Choleva Latreille, 1796
Nargus Thomson, 1867
Philomessor Jeannel, 1936
Prionochaeta Horn, 1880
Takobiella Ruzicka, 1992

Tribe Eucatopini

Eucatops Portevin, 1903

Tribe Leptodirini

Subtribe Anthroherponina

Anthroherpon Reitter, 1889
Croatodirus Casale, Giachino & Jalzic, 2000
Hadesia Muller, 1911
Kircheria Giachino & Vailati, 2006
Leptomeson Jeannel, 1924
Nauticiella Moravec & Mlejnek, 2002
Parantrophilon Noesske, 1914
Velebitodromus Casale, Giachino & Jalžic, 2004

Subtribe Bathysciina

Anillocharis Reitter, 1903
Anisoscapha Muller, 1917
Antrodulus Knirsch, 1927
Aphaobiella Gueorguiev, 1976
Aphaobius Abeille de Perrin, 1878
Augustia Zariquiey, 1927
Bathyscia Schiödte, 1848
Blattochaeta Reitter, 1910
Blattodromus Reitter, 1904
Cansiliella Paoletti, 1972
Deelemaniella Perreau, 2002
Epiroella
Henrotiella Perreau, 1999
Hexaurus Reitter, 1884
Huetheriella Jeannel, 1934
Leonhardella Reitter, 1903
Lessiniella Pavan, 1941
Lotharia Mandl, 1944
Netolitzkya Muller, 1913
Orostygia Muller, 1912
Oryotus Miller, 1856
Phaneropella Jeannel, 1910
Pholeuodromus Breit, 1913
Pholeuonopsis Apfelbeck, 1901
Pisidiella Jeannel, 1930
Pretneria Muller, 1931
Proleonhardella Jeannel, 1910
Prospelaeobates Giachino & Etonti, 1996
Serboleonhardella
Sinobathyscia Perreau, 1999
Speophyes Jeannel, 1910
Tartariella Nonveiller & Pavicevic, 1999
Weiratheria Zariquiey, 1927

Subtribe Bathysciotina

Aphaotus Breit, 1914
Bathyscidius Jeannel, 1910
Bathysciotes Jeannel, 1910
Halbherria Conci & Tamanini, 1951
Neobathyscia Muller, 1917
Pavicevicia Perreau, 2008
Pseudobathyscidius Karaman, 1964
Ravasinia Muller, 1922
Redensekia Karaman, 1953
Sinuicollia Piva, 2008
Speonesiotes Jeannel, 1910
Sphaerobathyscia Muller, 1917

Subtribe Leptodirina

Adelopidius Apfelbeck, 1907
Albanodirus Giachino & Vailati, 1998
Antrosedes Reitter, 1912
Apholeuonus Reitter, 1889
Astagobius Reitter, 1886
Balcanobius Gueorguiev, 1965
Bathyscimorphus Jeannel, 1910
Bathysciopsis Muller, 1941
Beroniella Giachino & Gueorguiev, 1991
Bulgariella Karaman, 1958
Ceuthmonocharis Jeannel, 1910
Charonites Apfelbeck, 1907
Elladoherpon Casale, 1983
Genestiellina Giachino, 1996
Haplotropidius Muller, 1903
Icharonia Reitter, 1912
Katobatizon Knirsch, 1928
Laneyriella Gueorguiev, 1976
Leonhardia Reitter, 1901
Leptodirus Schmidt, 1832
Leptostagus Karaman, 1954
Nonveilleriella Perreau & Pavicevic, 2008
Parapropus Ganglbauer, 1899
Petkovskiella Gueorguiev, 1976
Pholeuonella Jeannel, 1910
Pholeuonidius Jeannel, 1911
Protobracharthron Reitter, 1889
Radziella Casale & Jalzic, 1988
Remyella Jeannel, 1931
Rhaetiella Giachino & Vailati, 2005
Roubaliella Jeannel, 1925
Rozajella Curcic, Brajkovic & Curcic, 2007
Setnikia Breit, 1913
Spelaeodromus Reitter, 1884
Spelaites Apfelbeck, 1907
Speoplanes Muller, 1911

Subtribe Pholeuina

Adelopsella Jeannel, 1908
Albaniola Jeannel, 1924
Anillochlamys Jeannel, 1909
Antrocharis Abeille de Perrin, 1878
Aranzadiella Espaol, 1972
Archeoboldoria Ghidini, 1937
Atticiella Coiffait, 1955
Babuniella Karaman, 1954
Banatiola Decu, 1967
Baronniesia Fresneda, Bourdeau & Faille, 2009
Bathysciella Jeannel, 1906
Bathysciola Jeannel, 1910
Bellesia Fresneda & Hernando, 1994
Beronia Gueorguiev, 1960
Beskovia Gueorguiev, 1960
Besuchetiola Rampini & Zoia, 1991
Bithyniella Jeannel, 1955
Boldoria Jeannel, 1924
Breuilia Jeannel, 1909
Breuilites Salgado, 1980
Bureschiana Gueorguiev, 1963
Cacciamalia
Canavesiella Giachino, 1993
Cantabrogeus Salgado, 2000
Capraiola Zoia & Rampini, 1994
Cavazzutiella Casale & Giachino, 1985
Ceretophyes Comas & Escola, 1989
Ceuthophyes Jeannel, 1924
Closania Jeannel, 1928
Coiffaitiola Jeannel, 1955
Coreobathyscia Szymczakowski, 1975
Cryptobathyscia Vailati, 1980
Cytodromus Abeille de Perrin, 1876
Dalmatiola Jeannel, 1924
Dellabeffaella Capra, 1924
Diaprysius Abeille de Perrin, 1878
Drimeotus Miller, 1856
Espanoliella Gueorguiev, 1976
Euryspeonomus Jeannel, 1919
Fresnedaella
Frivaldszkya
Fusi Perkovsky, 1989
Gesciella Giachino & Guéorguiev, 1989
Ghidinia
Gueorguievella Giachino & Gueorguiev, 2006
Hartigiella
Hoffmannella Muller, 1912
Hussonella Jeannel, 1934
Insubriella Vailati, 1990
Iranobathyscia Zoia & Rampini, 1994
Isereus Reitter, 1886
Josettekia Belles & Deliot, 1983
Karadeniziella Casale & Giachino, 1989
Lagariella Fresneda, 2000
Leonesiella Salgado, 1996
Magdelainella Jeannel, 1924
Maroniella Casale & Giachino, 1985
Miettiella
Monguzziella Vailati, 1993
Muelleriella Jeannel, 1924
Nafarroa Fresneda & Dupré, 2010
Naspunius Fresneda, Hernando & Lagar, 1994
Notidocharis Jeannel, 1956
Ochridiola Sbordoni, 1971
Oresigenus Jeannel, 1948
Ovobathysciola Jeannel, 1924
Pallaresiella Fresneda, 1998
Pangaeoniola G. & M.Etonti, 1985
Parabathyscia Jeannel, 1908
Paranillochlamys Zariquiey, 1940
Paraspeonomus Coiffait, 1952
Paratroglophyes Fourès, 1954
Parvospeonomus Bellés & Escolà, 1977
Patriziella Jeannel, 1956
Pavaniola
Perriniella Jeannel, 1910
Phacomorphus Jeannel, 1908
Pholeuon Hampe, 1856
Proleptodirina Perkovsky, 1997
Protopholeuon Jeannel, 1923
Pseudoboldoria Ghidini, 1937
Pseudospeonomus Comas, Fresneda & Salgado, 2007
Purkynella Knirsch, 1926
Quaestus Schaufuss, 1861
Radevia Knirsch, 1925
Ragazzonia
Rhodopiola Gueorguiev, 1960
Royerella Jeannel, 1910
Salgadoia Fresneda, 1998
Sbordoniola Zoia & Rampini, 1994
Sengletiola Zoia & Rampini, 1994
Sophrochaeta Reitter, 1884
Spelaeochlamys Dieck, 1871
Speocharidius Jeannel, 1919
Speocharinus Espaol & Escola, 1977
Speodiaetus Jeannel, 1908
Speonomidius Jeannel, 1924
Speonomites Jeannel, 1910
Speonomus Jeannel, 1908
Stoppaniola
Stygiophyes Fresneda, 1998
Tismanella Jeannel, 1928
Trapezodirus Jeannel, 1924
Trocharanis Reitter, 1884
Troglocharinus Reitter, 1908
Troglodromus Sainte-Claire Deville, 1901
Troglophyes Abeille de Perrin, 1894
Viallia Pavan, 1950
Zariquieyella Jeannel, 1928

Subtribe Platycholeina

Platycholeus Horn, 1880

Subtribe Spelaeobatina

Spelaeobates Muller, 1901

Graciliella Njunjić, 2016

Tribe Oritocatopini

Afrocatops Jeannel, 1964
Chappuisiotes Jeannel, 1957
Oritocatops Jeannel, 1921

Tribe Ptomaphagini Jeannel, 1911

Subtribe Ptomaphagina Jeannel 1911

Acrotrychiopsis Normand, 1946
Adelopsis Portevin, 1907
Adelopspeleon Salgado, 2012
Amplexella Gnaspini, 1996
Parapaulipalpina Gnaspini, 1996
Paulipalpina Gnaspini & Peck, 1996
Peckena Gnaspini, 1996
Ptomaphagus Hellwig, 1795

Subtribe Ptomaphaginina

Pandania Szymczakowski, 1964
Proptomaphaginus Szymczakowski, 1969
Ptomaphaginus Portevin, 1914
Ptomaphaminus Perreau, 2000

Baryodirus Perreau, 2000

Tribe Sciaphyini

Sciaphyes Jeannel, 1924

Subfamily Coloninae Horn, 1880
Colon Herbst, 1797
Colonellus Szymczakowski, 1964
Subfamily Leiodinae Fleming, 1821
Tribe Agathidiini Westwood, 1838

Afroagathidium Angelini & Peck, 1984
Agathidium Panzer, 1797
Amphicyllis Erichson, 1845
Anisotoma Panzer, 1797
Besuchetionella Angelini & Peck, 2000
Cyrtoplastus Reitter, 1885
Decuria Miller & Wheeler, 2004
Gelae Miller & Wheeler, 2005
Liodopria Reitter, 1909
Pseudoagathidium Angelini, 1993
Stetholiodes Fall, 1910

Tribe Estadiini Portevin, 1914

Dietta Sharp, 1876

Tribe Leiodini Fleming, 1821

Afrocyrtusa Daffner, 1990
Afroleiodes Peck, 2003
Anogdus LeConte, 1866
Chobautiella Reitter, 1900
Cyrtusa Erichson, 1842
Cyrtusamorpha Daffner, 1983
Cyrtusoma Daffner, 1982
Ecarinosphaerula Hatch, 1929
Hypoliodes Portevin, 1908
Incacyrtusa Daffner, 1990
Isoplastus Horn, 1880
Leiodes Latreille, 1797
Liocyrtusa Daffner, 1982
Lionothus W.J.Brown, 1937
Ovocyrtusa Daffner, 1985
Parvocyrtusa Peck & Cook, 2014
Pseudolionothus Peck & Cook, 2014
Xanthosphaera Fairmaire, 1859
Zeadolopus Broun, 1903

Tribe Pseudoliodini Portevin, 1926

Agaricophagus Schmidt 1841
Allocolenisia Daffner, 1990
Ansibaris Reitter, 1883
Cainosternum Notman, 1921
Colenis Erichson, 1842
Colenisia Fauvel, 1903
Dermatohomoeus Hlisnikovský, 1963
Neohydnobius Jeannel, 1962
Pseudcolenis Reitter, 1884
Zelodes Leschen, 2000
†Mesagyrtoides Perkovsky, 1999
†Tafforeus Perreau, 2012

Tribe Scotocryptini Reitter, 1884

Aglyptinus Cockerell, 1906
Creagrophorus Matthews, 1887
Cyrtusiola Elisnikovsky, 1974
Parabystus Portevin, 1907
Popeus Hlisnikovsky, 1974
Scotocryptodes Portevin, 1907
Scotocryptus Girard, 1874
Synaristus Portevin, 1907
Termitoglobus Reichensperger, 1915

Tribe Sogdini Lopatin, 1961

Anaballetus Newton, Svec & Fikacek
Euliodes Portevin, 1937
Hinomoto Hoshina, 2002
Hydnobius Schmidt, 1841
Hydnodiaetus Jeannel, 1962
Isocolon Broun, 1893
Kalohydnobius Peck & Cook, 2009
Macrohydnobius Peck & Cook, 2009
Metahydnobius Portevin, 1942
Platyhydnobius Peck & Cook, 2009
Pseudotriarthron Normand, 1938
Sogda Lopatin, 1961
Triarthron Märkel, 1840

Subfamily Platypsyllinae Ritsema, 1869
Leptinillus Horn, 1882
Leptinus Müller, 1817
Platypsyllus Ritsema, 1869
Silphopsyllus Olsufiev, 1923
