= List of Leptodirini genera =

These 192 genera belong to Leptodirini, a tribe of small carrion beetles in the family Leiodidae. There are at least 750 described species in Leptodirini.

== Leptodirini genera ==
- Adelopidius Apfelbeck, 1907
- Adelopsella Jeannel, 1908
- Albaniola Jeannel, 1924
- Albanodirus Giachino & Vailati, 1998
- Anillocharis Reitter, 1903
- Anillochlamys Jeannel, 1909
- Anisoscapha Muller, 1917
- Anthroherpon Reitter, 1889
- Antrocharis Abeille de Perrin, 1878
- Antrodulus Knirsch, 1927
- Antrosedes Reitter, 1912
- Aphaobiella Gueorguiev, 1976
- Aphaobius Abeille de Perrin, 1878
- Aphaotus Breit, 1914
- Apholeuonus Reitter, 1889
- Archeoboldoria Ghidini, 1937
- Astagobius Reitter, 1886
- Atticiella Coiffait, 1955
- Augustia Zariquiey, 1927
- Babuniella Karaman, 1954
- Balcanobius Gueorguiev, 1965
- Banatiola Decu, 1967
- Baronniesia Fresneda, Bourdeau & Faille, 2009
- Bathyscia Schiödte, 1848
- Bathyscidius Jeannel, 1910
- Bathysciella Jeannel, 1906
- Bathyscimorphus Jeannel, 1910
- Bathysciola Jeannel, 1910
- Bathysciopsis Muller, 1941
- Bathysciotes Jeannel, 1910
- Bellesia Fresneda & Hernando, 1994
- Beronia Gueorguiev, 1960
- Beroniella Giachino & Gueorguiev, 1991
- Beskovia Gueorguiev, 1960
- Besuchetiola Rampini & Zoia, 1991
- Bithyniella Jeannel, 1955
- Blattochaeta Reitter, 1910
- Blattodromus Reitter, 1904
- Boldoria Jeannel, 1924
- Breuilia Jeannel, 1909
- Breuilites Salgado, 1980
- Bulgariella Karaman, 1958
- Bureschiana Gueorguiev, 1963
- Canavesiella Giachino, 1993
- Cansiliella Paoletti, 1972
- Cantabrogeus Salgado, 2000
- Capraiola Zoia & Rampini, 1994
- Cavazzutiella Casale & Giachino, 1985
- Ceretophyes Comas & Escola, 1989
- Ceuthmonocharis Jeannel, 1910
- Ceuthophyes Jeannel, 1924
- Charonites Apfelbeck, 1907
- Closania Jeannel, 1928
- Coiffaitiola Jeannel, 1955
- Coreobathyscia Szymczakowski, 1975
- Croatodirus Casale, Giachino & Jalzic, 2000
- Cryptobathyscia Vailati, 1980
- Cytodromus Abeille de Perrin, 1876
- Dalmatiola Jeannel, 1924
- Deelemaniella Perreau, 2002
- Dellabeffaella Capra, 1924
- Diaprysius Abeille de Perrin, 1878
- Drimeotus Miller, 1856
- Elladoherpon Casale, 1983
- Espanoliella Gueorguiev, 1976
- Euryspeonomus Jeannel, 1919
- Genestiellina Giachino, 1996
- Gesciella Giachino & Guéorguiev, 1989
- Graciliella Njunjić et al., 2016
- Gueorguievella Giachino & Gueorguiev, 2006
- Hadesia Muller, 1911
- Halbherria Conci & Tamanini, 1951
- Haplotropidius Muller, 1903
- Henrotiella Perreau, 1999
- Hexaurus Reitter, 1884
- Hoffmannella Muller, 1912
- Huetheriella Jeannel, 1934
- Hussonella Jeannel, 1934
- Icharonia Reitter, 1912
- Insubriella Vailati, 1990
- Iranobathyscia Zoia & Rampini, 1994
- Isereus Reitter, 1886
- Josettekia Belles & Deliot, 1983
- Karadeniziella Casale & Giachino, 1989
- Katobatizon Knirsch, 1928
- Kircheria Giachino & Vailati, 2006
- Lagariella Fresneda, 2000
- Laneyriella Gueorguiev, 1976
- Leonesiella Salgado, 1996
- Leonhardella Reitter, 1903
- Leonhardia Reitter, 1901
- Leptodirus Schmidt, 1832
- Leptomeson Jeannel, 1924
- Leptostagus Karaman, 1954
- Lessiniella Pavan, 1941
- Lotharia Mandl, 1944
- Magdelainella Jeannel, 1924
- Maroniella Casale & Giachino, 1985
- Mehadiella Csiki, 1899
- Monguzziella Vailati, 1993
- Muelleriella Jeannel, 1924
- Nafarroa Fresneda & Dupré, 2010
- Naspunius Fresneda, Hernando & Lagar, 1994
- Nauticiella Moravec & Mlejnek, 2002
- Neobathyscia Muller, 1917
- Netolitzkya Muller, 1913
- Nonveilleriella Perreau & Pavicevic, 2008
- Notidocharis Jeannel, 1956
- Ochridiola Sbordoni, 1971
- Oresigenus Jeannel, 1948
- Orostygia Muller, 1912
- Oryotus Miller, 1856
- Ovobathysciola Jeannel, 1924
- Pallaresiella Fresneda, 1998
- Pangaeoniola G. & M.Etonti, 1985
- Parabathyscia Jeannel, 1908
- Paranillochlamys Zariquiey, 1940
- Parantrophilon Noesske, 1914
- Parapropus Ganglbauer, 1899
- Paraspeonomus Coiffait, 1952
- Paratroglophyes Fourès, 1954
- Parvospeonomus Bellés & Escolà, 1977
- Patriziella Jeannel, 1956
- Pavicevicia Perreau, 2008
- Perriniella Jeannel, 1910
- Phacomorphus Jeannel, 1908
- Phaneropella Jeannel, 1910
- Pholeuodromus Breit, 1913
- Pholeuon Hampe, 1856
- Pholeuonella Jeannel, 1910
- Pholeuonidius Jeannel, 1911
- Pholeuonopsis Apfelbeck, 1901
- Pisidiella Jeannel, 1930
- Platycholeus Horn, 1880
- Pretneria Muller, 1931
- Proleonhardella Jeannel, 1910
- Proleptodirina Perkovsky, 1997
- Prospelaeobates Giachino & Etonti, 1996
- Protobracharthron Reitter, 1889
- Protopholeuon Jeannel, 1923
- Pseudobathyscidius Karaman, 1964
- Pseudoboldoria Ghidini, 1937
- Pseudospeonomus Comas, Fresneda & Salgado, 2007
- Purkynella Knirsch, 1926
- Quaestus Schaufuss, 1861
- Radevia Knirsch, 1925
- Radziella Casale & Jalzic, 1988
- Ravasinia Muller, 1922
- Redensekia Karaman, 1953
- Reinholdina Giachino & Moravec, 2009
- Remyella Jeannel, 1931
- Rhaetiella Giachino & Vailati, 2005
- Rhodopiola Gueorguiev, 1960
- Roubaliella Jeannel, 1925
- Royerella Jeannel, 1910
- Rozajella Curcic, Brajkovic & Curcic, 2007
- Salgadoia Fresneda, 1998
- Sbordoniola Zoia & Rampini, 1994
- Sengletiola Zoia & Rampini, 1994
- Serbopholeuonopsis Ćurčić & Boškova, 2002
- Setnikia Breit, 1913
- Sinobathyscia Perreau, 1999
- Sinuicollia Piva, 2008
- Sophrochaeta Reitter, 1884
- Spelaeobates Muller, 1901
- Spelaeochlamys Dieck, 1871
- Spelaeodromus Reitter, 1884
- Spelaites Apfelbeck, 1907
- Speocharidius Jeannel, 1919
- Speocharinus Espaol & Escola, 1977
- Speodiaetus Jeannel, 1908
- Speonesiotes Jeannel, 1910
- Speonomidius Jeannel, 1924
- Speonomites Jeannel, 1910
- Speonomus Jeannel, 1908
- Speophyes Jeannel, 1910
- Speoplanes Muller, 1911
- Sphaerobathyscia Muller, 1917
- Stygiophyes Fresneda, 1998
- Tartariella Nonveiller & Pavicevic, 1999
- Tismanella Jeannel, 1928
- Trapezodirus Jeannel, 1924
- Trocharanis Reitter, 1884
- Troglocharinus Reitter, 1908
- Troglodromus Sainte-Claire Deville, 1901
- Troglophyes Abeille de Perrin, 1894
- Velebitodromus Casale, Giachino & Jalžic, 2004
- Viallia Pavan, 1950
- Weiratheria Zariquiey, 1927
- Zariquieyella Jeannel, 1928
- † Aranzadiella Espaol, 1972
- † Petkovskiella Gueorguiev, 1976
