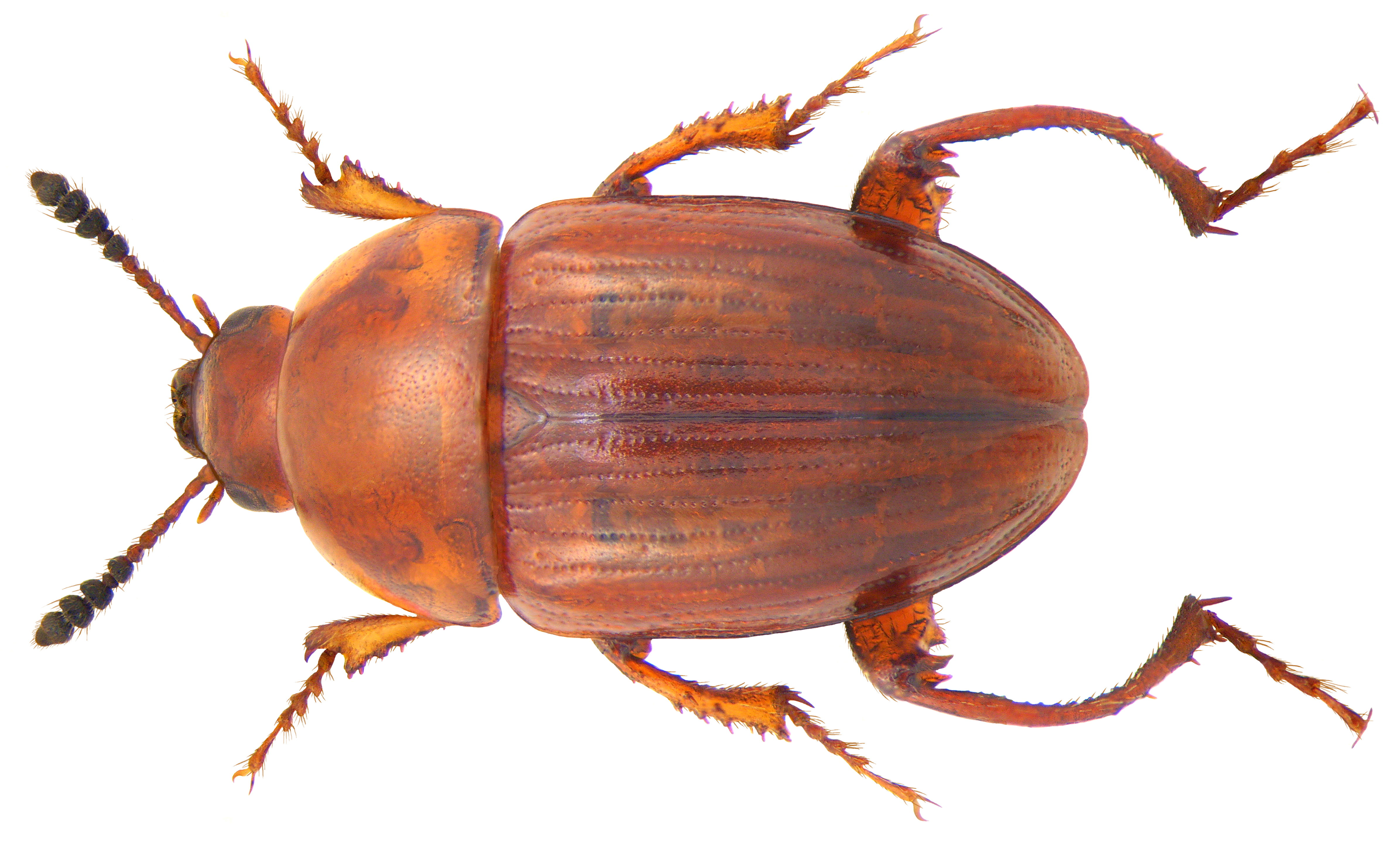
- Leiodes

Scientific classification
- Domain: Eukaryota
- Kingdom: Animalia
- Phylum: Arthropoda
- Class: Insecta
- Order: Coleoptera
- Suborder: Polyphaga
- Infraorder: Staphyliniformia
- Family: Leiodidae
- Subfamily: Leiodinae; Fleming, 1821

= Leiodinae =

Subfamily of beetles

Leiodinae is a subfamily of round fungus beetles in the family Leiodidae. There are more than 60 genera and 1,800 described species in Leiodinae.

== Genera ==
These 65 genera belong to the subfamily Leiodinae:

Tribe Agathidiini Westwood, 1838
Afroagathidium Angelini & Peck, 1984
Agathidium Panzer, 1797
Amphicyllis Erichson, 1845
Anisotoma Panzer, 1797
Besuchetionella Angelini & Peck, 2000
Cyrtoplastus Reitter, 1885
Decuria Miller & Wheeler, 2004
Gelae Miller & Wheeler, 2005
Liodopria Reitter, 1909
Pseudoagathidium Angelini, 1993
Stetholiodes Fall, 1910
Tribe Estadiini Portevin, 1914
Dietta Sharp, 1876
Tribe Leiodini Fleming, 1821
Afrocyrtusa Daffner, 1990
Afroleiodes Peck, 2003
Anogdus LeConte, 1866
Chobautiella Reitter, 1900
Cyrtusa Erichson, 1842
Cyrtusamorpha Daffner, 1983
Cyrtusoma Daffner, 1982
Ecarinosphaerula Hatch, 1929
Hypoliodes Portevin, 1908
Incacyrtusa Daffner, 1990
Isoplastus Horn, 1880
Leiodes Latreille, 1797
Liocyrtusa Daffner, 1982
Lionothus W.J.Brown, 1937
Ovocyrtusa Daffner, 1985
Parvocyrtusa Peck & Cook, 2014
Pseudolionothus Peck & Cook, 2014
Xanthosphaera Fairmaire, 1859
Zeadolopus Broun, 1903
Tribe Pseudoliodini Portevin, 1926
Agaricophagus Schmidt 1841
Allocolenisia Daffner, 1990
Ansibaris Reitter, 1883
Cainosternum Notman, 1921
Colenis Erichson, 1842
Colenisia Fauvel, 1903
Dermatohomoeus Hlisnikovský, 1963
Neohydnobius Jeannel, 1962
Pseudcolenis Reitter, 1884
Zelodes Leschen, 2000
†Mesagyrtoides Perkovsky, 1999
†Tafforeus Perreau, 2012
Tribe Scotocryptini Reitter, 1884
Aglyptinus Cockerell, 1906
Creagrophorus Matthews, 1887
Cyrtusiola Elisnikovsky, 1974
Parabystus Portevin, 1907
Popeus Hlisnikovsky, 1974
Scotocryptodes Portevin, 1907
Scotocryptus Girard, 1874
Synaristus Portevin, 1907
Termitoglobus Reichensperger, 1915
Tribe Sogdini Lopatin, 1961
Anaballetus Newton, Svec & Fikacek
Euliodes Portevin, 1937
Hinomoto Hoshina, 2002
Hydnobius Schmidt, 1841
Hydnodiaetus Jeannel, 1962
Isocolon Broun, 1893
Kalohydnobius Peck & Cook, 2009
Macrohydnobius Peck & Cook, 2009
Metahydnobius Portevin, 1942
Platyhydnobius Peck & Cook, 2009
Pseudotriarthron Normand, 1938
Sogda Lopatin, 1961
Triarthron Märkel, 1840
