= Bathyscidius =

Scientific classification
- Kingdom: Animalia
- Phylum: Arthropoda
- Clade: Pancrustacea
- Class: Insecta
- Order: Coleoptera
- Suborder: Polyphaga
- Infraorder: Staphyliniformia
- Family: Leiodidae
- Subfamily: Cholevinae
- Tribe: Leptodirini
- Genus: Bathyscidius; Jeannel, 1910

Genus of beetles

Bathyscidius is a genus of subterranean beetles in the family Leiodidae.It is endemic to Western Balkans.

== Species ==
Bathyscidius consists of at least 10 species:

- Bathyscidius basarai D. Čeplík, Lakota & J. Čeplík, 2021 (Albania)
- Bathyscidius crnagorensis Fresneda, J., Giachino, P.M., Salgado, J.M., Faille, A., Bourdeau, C., Cieslak, A. & Ribera, I., 2024 (Montenegro)
- Bathyscidius fallaciosus Polak & Jalžić, 2019 (Croatia)
- Bathyscidius komajiensis Polak & Jalžić, 2019 (Croatia)
- Bathyscidius mikati Udržal, 1995 (Serbia)
- Bathyscidius mljetensis Polak & Jalžić, 2019 (Mljet Island, Croatia)
- Bathyscidius orjensis Polak & Jalžić, 2019 (Montenegro)
- Bathyscidius rambouseki Knirsch, 1931 (North Macedonia)
- Bathyscidius rotundum Dall, 1927 (Croatia)
- Bathyscidius tomoricensis Müller, 1922 (Albania)
- Bathyscidius tristiculus Apfelbeck, 1905 (Croatia)

Bathyscidius remyi was originally described as a distinct species within the genus Bathyscidius. However, a subsequent taxonomic revision resulted in its transfer to the genus Laneyriella, where it is now considered a synonym of the species Laneyriella andrijevicensis.
