= Burmaphagus =

Scientific classification
- Domain: Eukaryota
- Kingdom: Animalia
- Phylum: Arthropoda
- Class: Insecta
- Order: Coleoptera
- Suborder: Polyphaga
- Infraorder: Staphyliniformia
- Family: Leiodidae
- Subfamily: Cholevinae
- Tribe: Ptomaphagini
- Genus: †Burmaphagus; Yamamoto & Perreau, 2025
- Species: †B. yamamotoae

Binomial name
- †Burmaphagus yamamotoae Yamamoto & Perreau, 2025

Extinct species of beetle

Burmaphagus is an extinct, monotypic genus of beetles in the subfamily Cholevinae (family Leiodidae). Its only known species is Burmaphagus yamamotoae, described from mid-Cretaceous Kachin amber of northern Myanmar.

== Taxonomy ==
Burmaphagus yamamotoae was described in 2025 by Shuhei Yamamoto and Michel Perreau. The genus is placed within the tribe Ptomaphagini, subtribe Ptomaphagina.

The name Burmaphagus is a combination of "Burma" (former name of Myanmar) and the type genus of the tribe, Ptomaphagus. The species name honors Sora Yamamoto and Ayako Yamamoto, who provided the specimen.

== Description ==
The holotype, an adult of undetermined sex, is embedded in yellowish transparent amber. The body is elongate-elliptical and weakly convex dorsally, measuring 1.78 mm in length. It is uniformly dark brown to dark reddish brown, with slightly lighter legs, mouthparts, and terminalia.

The head is prognathous and transverse with compound eyes and long, thick antennae of 11 antennomeres. The pronotum is transverse and widest at the base, while the elytra are elongate, convex, and sharply narrowed posteriorly. The legs are slender, with the tarsi longer than their respective tibiae and a crown of spines at the apex of all tibiae.

The specimen exhibits several distinguishing traits compared to other members of the tribe, including submoniliform antennae with an indistinct club, subsquare eighth antennomere, and notably long tarsi.

== Distribution and habitat ==
The fossil originates from the Hukawng Valley in Kachin State, northern Myanmar. The amber is dated to the mid-Cretaceous, specifically between the Upper Albian and Lower Cenomanian stages.
