= Anthroherpon sinjajevina =

Scientific classification
- Kingdom: Animalia
- Phylum: Arthropoda
- Class: Insecta
- Order: Coleoptera
- Suborder: Polyphaga
- Infraorder: Staphyliniformia
- Family: Leiodidae
- Subfamily: Cholevinae
- Tribe: Leptodirini
- Genus: Anthroherpon
- Species: A. sinjajevina

Binomial name
- Anthroherpon sinjajevina (Njunjić, Perreau & Pavićević, 2015)
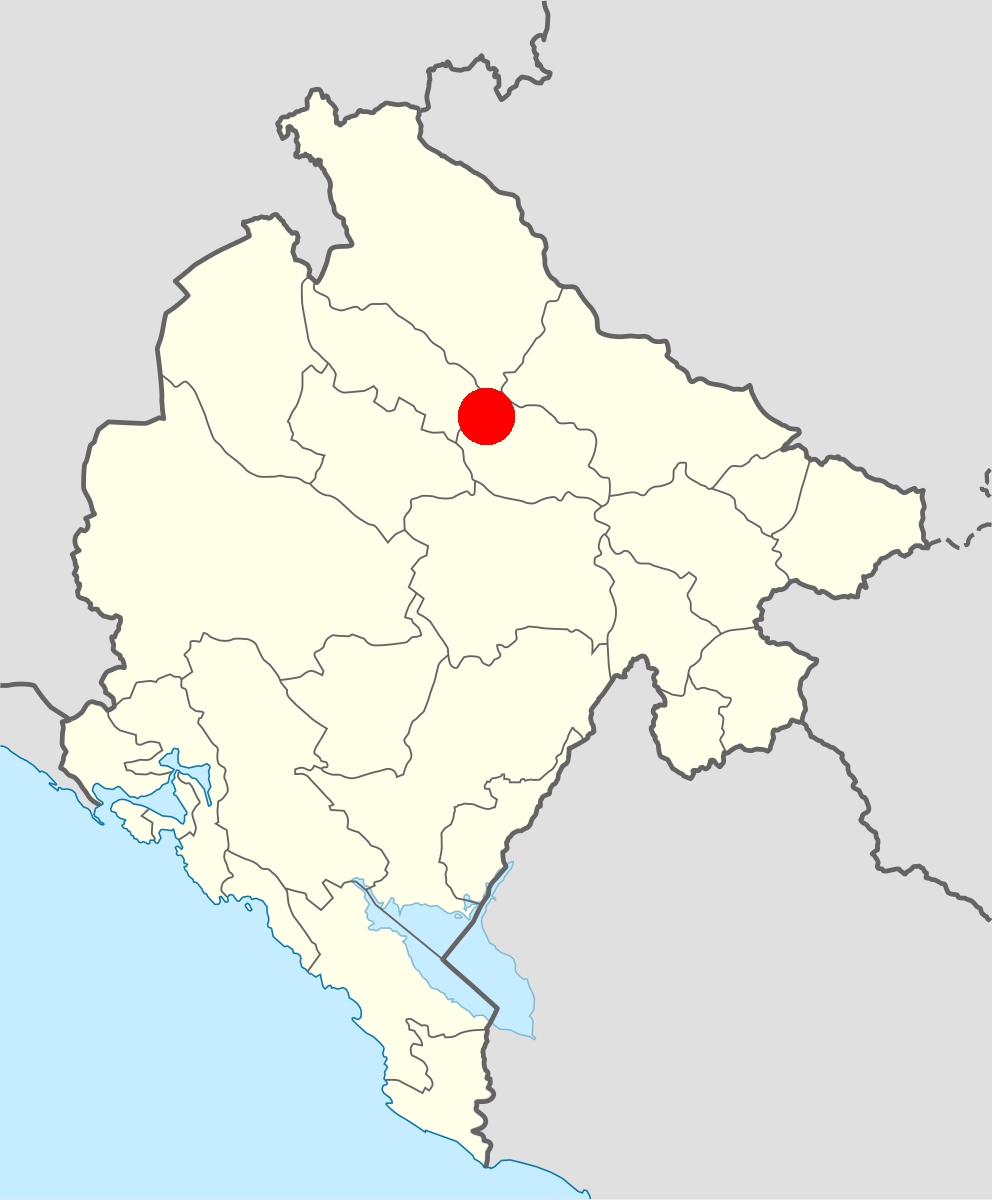

Species of beetle

Anthroherpon sinjajevina is a species of cave-dwelling beetle in the family Leiodidae.

== Distribution ==
Anthroherpon sinjajevina is endemic to Montenegro, specifically the Žabljak municipality. It is most likely restricted to the Blažova pećina near the Sinjajevina mountain. The species is known only from a single holotype specimen.
