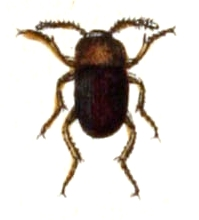
- Apocatops nigrita

Scientific classification
- Kingdom: Animalia
- Phylum: Arthropoda
- Class: Insecta
- Order: Coleoptera
- Suborder: Polyphaga
- Infraorder: Staphyliniformia
- Family: Leiodidae
- Subfamily: Cholevinae
- Tribe: Cholevini; Kirby, 1837

= Cholevini =

Tribe of beetles

Cholevini is a tribe of small carrion beetles in the family Leiodidae. There are more than 20 genera and 200 described species in Cholevini.

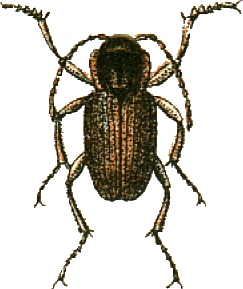
Choleva elongata

== Genera ==
These 25 genera belong to the tribe Cholevini:

- Apocatops Zwick, 1968
- Apterocatops Miyama, 1985
- Attaephilus Motschoulsky, 1870
- Attumbra Gozis, 1886
- Catopidius Jeannel, 1922
- Catopodes Portevin, 1914
- Catops Paykull, 1798
- Catopsimorphus Aubé, 1850
- Catoptrichus Murray, 1856
- Chionocatops Ganglbauer, 1899
- Choleva Latreille, 1796
- Cholevinus Reitter, 1901
- Dreposcia Jeannel, 1922
- Dzungarites Jeannel, 1936
- Fissocatops Zwick, 1968
- Fusi (beetle)|Fusi
- Himalops Perreau, 1986
- Mesocatops Szymczakowski, 1961
- Nargus Thomson, 1867
- Nipponemadus Perreau, 2004
- Philomessor Jeannel, 1936
- Prionochaeta Horn, 1880
- Rybinskiella Reitter, 1906
- Sciodrepoides Hatch, 1933
- Takobiella Ruzicka, 1992
