= Aglyptinus laevis =

Scientific classification
- Domain: Eukaryota
- Kingdom: Animalia
- Phylum: Arthropoda
- Class: Insecta
- Order: Coleoptera
- Suborder: Polyphaga
- Infraorder: Staphyliniformia
- Family: Leiodidae
- Genus: Aglyptinus
- Species: A. laevis

Binomial name
- Aglyptinus laevis (LeConte, 1853)

Species of beetle

Aglyptinus laevis is a species of round fungus beetle in the family Leiodidae. It is found in North America.
