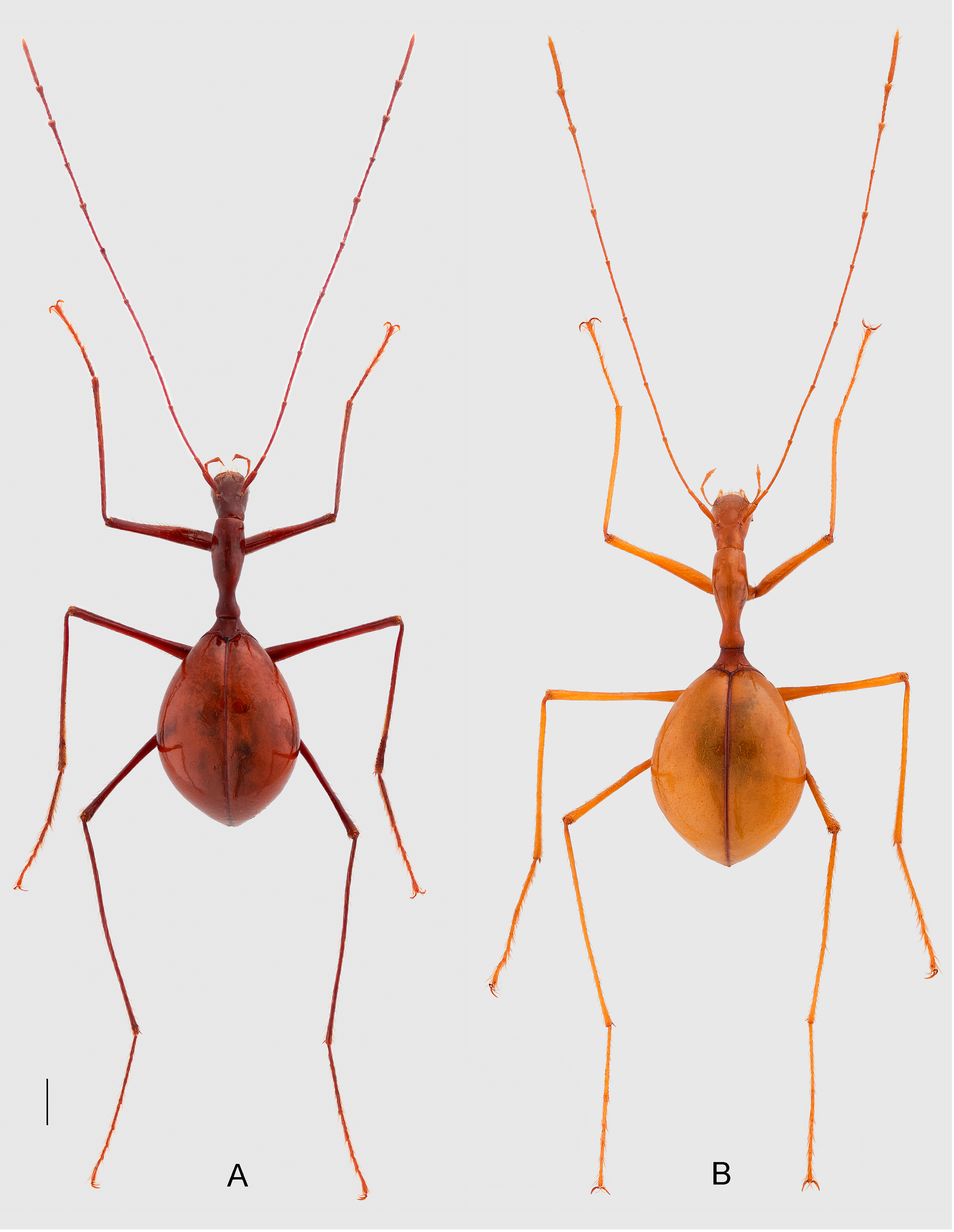
- G. apfelbecki and G. metohijensis

Scientific classification
- Kingdom: Animalia
- Phylum: Arthropoda
- Clade: Pancrustacea
- Class: Insecta
- Order: Coleoptera
- Suborder: Polyphaga
- Infraorder: Staphyliniformia
- Family: Leiodidae
- Subfamily: Cholevinae
- Tribe: Leptodirini
- Genus: Graciliella; Njunjić et al., 2016

Type species
- Graciliella apfelbecki apfelbecki (Müller, 1910)

Species
- See text

= Graciliella =

Genus of beetles

Graciliella is a genus of cave beetle in the family Leiodidae. It was previously included in the genus Anthroherpon but DNA evidence showed that it is actually a more distantly related group of species. The paper in which Graciliella was published gained some media attention, with several stories picking up on the spider-like appearance of these beetles. Graciliella currently consists of six species, including the newly discovered Graciliella kosovaci and Graciliella ozimeci All species occur in subterranean habitats of the Dinaric Mountains, from Crvanj mountain (Bosnia and Herzegovina) in the north, to Trnovo (Montenegro) in the south, and from Žaba mountain (Croatia) in the west to Prokletije mountain (Montenegro) in the east.

These beetles are highly specialized for life underground, with elongated limbs, pale coloration, and reduced or absent eyes, adaptations common in troglobitic species. Their unique morphology, combined with their restricted range, makes them of particular interest to evolutionary biologists studying cave biodiversity in the Balkans.

== Species ==
- Graciliella absoloni (Guéorguiev, 1990)
- Graciliella apfelbecki (Müller, 1910)
  - Graciliella apfelbecki apfelbecki (Müller, 1910)
  - Graciliella apfelbecki scutulatum (Giachino & Guéorguiev, 1993)
  - Graciliella apfelbecki schwienbacheri (Giachino & Vailati, 2005)
  - Graciliella apfelbecki sculptifrons (Winkler, 1925)
- Graciliella kosovaci Njunjić et al., 2016
- Graciliella lahneri (Matcha, 1916)
- Graciliella metohijensis (Zariquiey, 1927)
- Graciliella ozimeci Njunjić et al., 2016
