= Rozajella jovanvladimiri =

Scientific classification
- Kingdom: Animalia
- Phylum: Arthropoda
- Class: Insecta
- Order: Coleoptera
- Suborder: Polyphaga
- Infraorder: Staphyliniformia
- Family: Leiodidae
- Subfamily: Cholevinae
- Genus: Rozajella
- Species: R. jovanvladimiri

Binomial name
- Rozajella jovanvladimiri (S.Ćurčić, Brajković & B.Ćurčić, 2007)
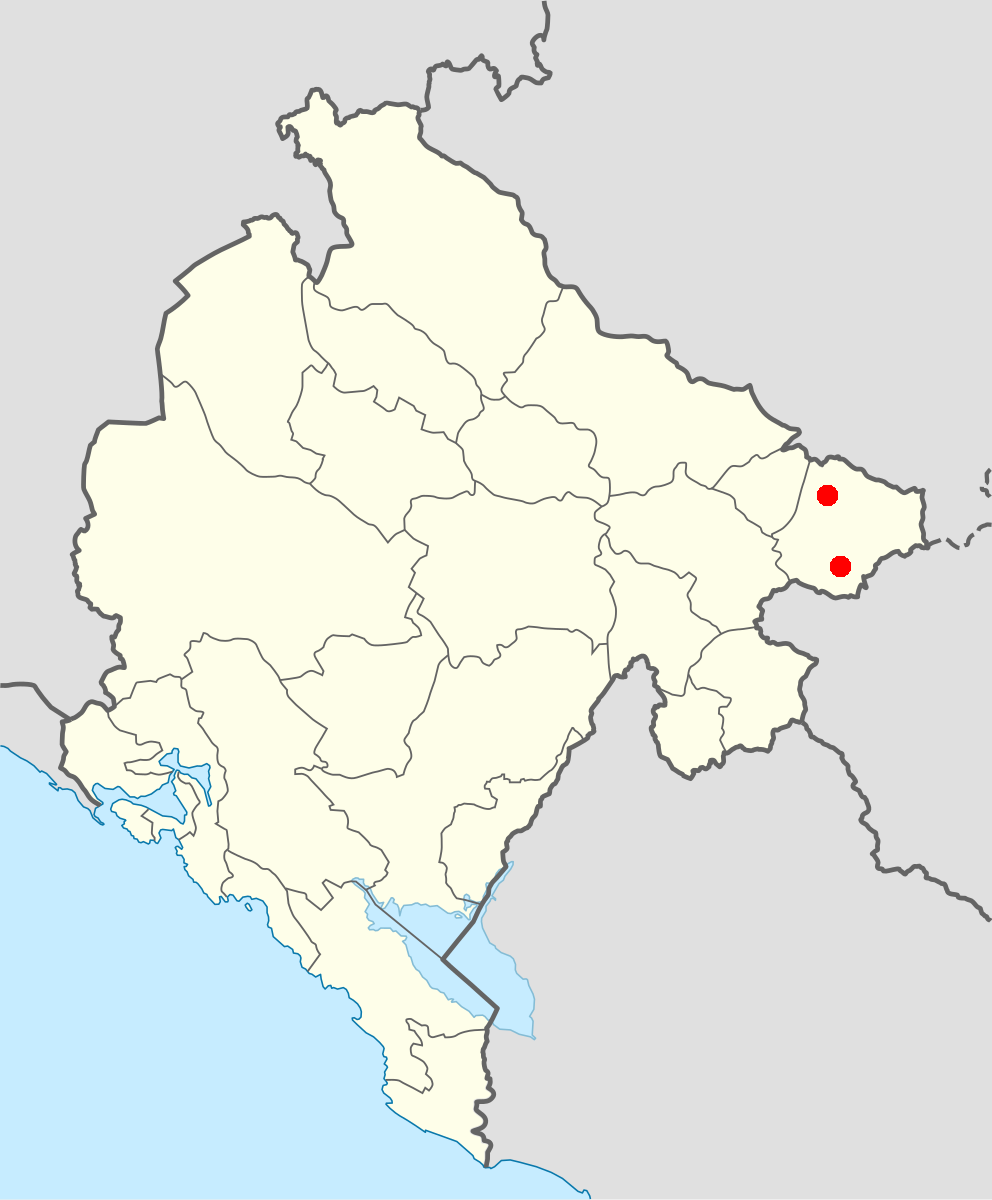

Species of beetle

Rozajella jovanvladimiri is a species of cave-dwelling beetle in the family Leiodidae. It is found in Montenegro.

== Distribution ==
This species is endemic to Montenegro.The male holotype was collected from the Pećina u Dubokom Potoku Cave, near the village of Donte Biševo, to which this species’ range is likely restricted.
