= Augustia =

Scientific classification
- Kingdom: Animalia
- Phylum: Arthropoda
- Class: Insecta
- Order: Coleoptera
- Suborder: Polyphaga
- Infraorder: Staphyliniformia
- Family: Leiodidae
- Subfamily: Cholevinae
- Tribe: Leptodirini
- Subtribe: Bathysciina; Zariquiey, 1927
- Genus: Augustia; Zariquiey, 1927

Genus of insect

Augustia is a monotypic genus of cave-dwelling leiodid beetle found in Bosnia and Herzegovina. It is represented by a single known species, Augustia weiratheri. It was described and named by Ricardo Zariquiey in 1927.

The first specimens of Augustia weiratheri were collected by the biospeleologist Leo Weirather, from a cave in Čvrsnica that he nicknamed "Vuk jama". However, he obscured his collection localities using code names to guard them against less scrupulous collectors.

== Appearance ==
The body is 3 mm long with a reddish testaceous color, fine dense punctuation, and short appressed pubescence. The antennae reach the mid-body; the first segment is shorter than the second. Segment III is slightly longer than 4, about 3.5 times longer than wide. Segment 8 is cylindrical, just over twice as long as wide. The final three segments (9–11) are flattened.

The pronotum is bell-shaped, as wide as the elytral base, with slightly rounded sides and a faintly bisinuate base. The elytra are not strongly convex, slightly longer than wide, and attenuated toward both base and apex. Their maximum width is at the posterior two-thirds. The apices are separately rounded and divergent, with a visible marginal rim nearly to the tip. There is no sutural stria.

The fore tibiae lack a true comb and have a well-developed external spur. Intermediate tibiae are slightly spinose. The male fore tarsi are four-segmented, slightly dilated but narrower than the tibial apex.

The mesosternal keel is very high, inserted directly behind the articular collar. Its anterior edge forms a rounded quarter-circle; the ventral edge is faintly sinuate. Their junction forms an obtuse, untoothed angle. The anterior edge is thin, the ventral edge thickens toward the metasternum, which is unkeeled.

=== Male Genitalia ===
The genital organ is short and broad. The penis has parallel sides that narrow abruptly and curve at the apex, terminating in a triangular, depressed beak. The basal lamina is broad with a well-developed tongue at its free edge midpoint. The lateral styles are longer than the penis, clubbed apically, and bear three setae: one terminal, one subterminal, and a more distant ventral seta.

The internal sac contains a central chitinous piece: short, broad, strongly incurved, and slightly lanceolate apically. It is flanked by two elongated, slightly bent chitinous pieces that are broad basally and pointed apically. The sac is transparent around this armature; its mid-portion has thicker, opaque, wrinkled walls without chitinous structures.

== Taxonomy ==
Augustia shares several characteristics with Anthrodulus, Bozidaria, Henrotiella, Proleonhardella and Weiratheria, and is probably closely related to them.
