= Bathyscidius orjensis =

Scientific classification
- Kingdom: Animalia
- Phylum: Arthropoda
- Clade: Pancrustacea
- Class: Insecta
- Order: Coleoptera
- Suborder: Polyphaga
- Infraorder: Staphyliniformia
- Family: Leiodidae
- Subfamily: Cholevinae
- Genus: Bathyscidius
- Species: B. orjensis

Binomial name
- Bathyscidius orjensis Polak & Jalžić, 2019
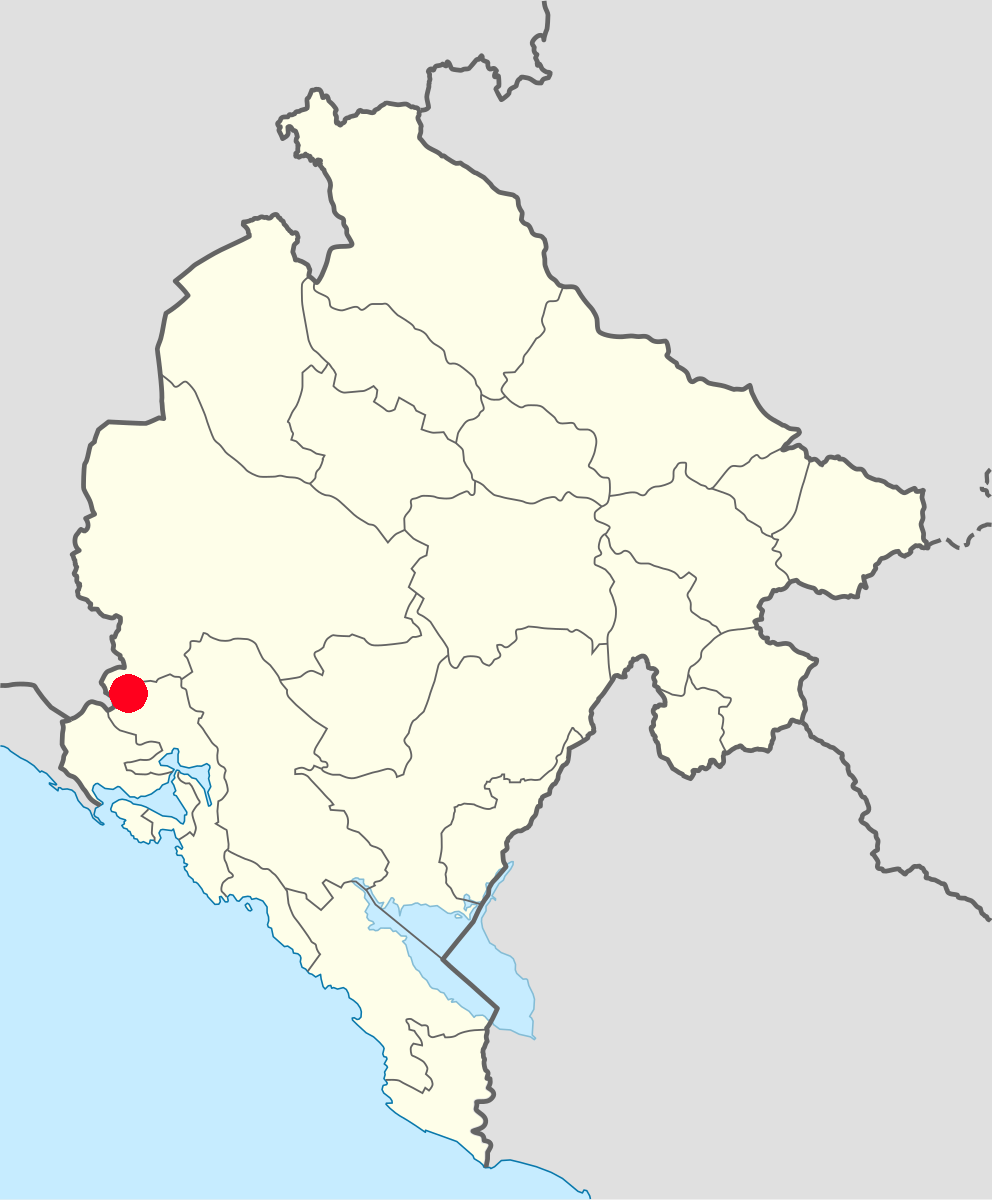
- Bathyscidius orjensis holotype map

Species of beetle

Bathyscidius orjensis is a species of subterranean beetle in the family Leiodidae.It is found in Montenegro.

== Distribution ==
This species is endemic to southwestern Montenegro. It is known only from its type locality near the village of Kruševice on the southern slope of Orjen Mountain, at an altitude of approximately 750 meters above sea level. The species inhabits the Mesovoid Shallow Substratum (MSS), a superficial subterranean habitat within the soil and rocky debris.
