= Adelopsis miguelmonnei =

Scientific classification
- Kingdom: Animalia
- Phylum: Arthropoda
- Clade: Pancrustacea
- Class: Insecta
- Order: Coleoptera
- Suborder: Polyphaga
- Infraorder: Staphyliniformia
- Family: Leiodidae
- Subfamily: Cholevinae
- Genus: Adelopsis
- Species: A. miguelmonnei

Binomial name
- Adelopsis miguelmonnei Gomyde & Gnaspini, 2026

Species of beetle

Adelopsis miguelmonnei is a species of beetle of the family Leiodidae. It is found in Brazil (Pará).

== Description ==
Adults reach a length of about 1.3–1.6 mm (0.051–0.063 in). They have a ovoid body, which is approximately twice as long as wide. They are winged. The colour of the body is brown, with the integument punctate. The punctures are not organized in strigae on the head, but form transverse strigae on the pronotum and transverse, slightly diagonal strigae on the elytra.

== Etymology ==
The species is dedicated to Professor Miguel Angel Monné.
