= Ptomaphagus germari =

Scientific classification
- Domain: Eukaryota
- Kingdom: Animalia
- Phylum: Arthropoda
- Class: Insecta
- Order: Coleoptera
- Suborder: Polyphaga
- Infraorder: Staphyliniformia
- Superfamily: Staphylinoidea
- Family: Leiodidae
- Subfamily: Cholevinae
- Genus: Ptomaphagus
- Species: P. germari

Binomial name
- Ptomaphagus germari Schlechtendahl, 1888

Synonyms
- Mordella inclusa (Germar, 1813); Mordellina inclusa Germar, 1813

Species of beetles

Ptomaphagus germari is a species of round fungus beetle in the family Leiodidae. It is found in Europe (Eocene: Baltic amber).
