= Sogdini =

Scientific classification
- Kingdom: Animalia
- Phylum: Arthropoda
- Clade: Pancrustacea
- Class: Insecta
- Order: Coleoptera
- Suborder: Polyphaga
- Infraorder: Staphyliniformia
- Family: Leiodidae
- Subfamily: Leiodinae
- Tribe: Sogdini; Lopatin, 1961

Tribe of beetles

Sogdini is a tribe of round fungus beetles in the family Leiodidae. There are about 7 genera and at least 20 described species in Sogdini.

== Genera ==
- Hydnobius Schmidt, 1841
- Kalohydnobius Peck & Cook, 2009
- Macrohydnobius Peck & Cook, 2009
- Platyhydnobius Peck & Cook, 2009
- Sogda Lopatin, 1961
- Stereus Wollaston, 1857
- Triarthron Märkel, 1840
