= Macrohydnobius matthewsii =

Scientific classification
- Domain: Eukaryota
- Kingdom: Animalia
- Phylum: Arthropoda
- Class: Insecta
- Order: Coleoptera
- Suborder: Polyphaga
- Infraorder: Staphyliniformia
- Family: Leiodidae
- Genus: Macrohydnobius
- Species: M. matthewsii

Binomial name
- Macrohydnobius matthewsii (Crotch, 1874)

Synonyms
- Hydnobius matthewsii Crotch, 1874; Hydnobius stacesmithi Hatch, 1957

Species of beetle

Macrohydnobius matthewsii is a species of round fungus beetle in the family Leiodidae. It is found in North America.
