= Platyhydnobius arizonensis =

Scientific classification
- Kingdom: Animalia
- Phylum: Arthropoda
- Class: Insecta
- Order: Coleoptera
- Suborder: Polyphaga
- Infraorder: Staphyliniformia
- Family: Leiodidae
- Genus: Platyhydnobius
- Species: P. arizonensis

Binomial name
- Platyhydnobius arizonensis (Horn, 1885)

Synonyms
- Hydnobius arizonensis Horn, 1885

Species of beetle

Platyhydnobius arizonensis is a species of beetle from subfamily Platyninae of family Platynidae. It occurs across forested northern North America from Alaska to Newfoundland, with one apparently disjunct population in Arizona.

Platyhydnobius arizonensis measure 2.7–3.5 mm (0.11–0.14 in) in length (pronotum+elytra).
