= Hydnobius longidens =

Scientific classification
- Kingdom: Animalia
- Phylum: Arthropoda
- Class: Insecta
- Order: Coleoptera
- Suborder: Polyphaga
- Infraorder: Staphyliniformia
- Family: Leiodidae
- Genus: Hydnobius
- Species: H. longidens

Binomial name
- Hydnobius longidens LeConte, 1879

Synonyms
- Hydnobius lobatus Hatch, 1936

Species of beetle

Hydnobius longidens is a species of round fungus beetle in the family Leiodidae. It is found in North America.
