= Adelopsis =

- Adelopsis miguelmonnei

Scientific classification
- Kingdom: Animalia
- Phylum: Arthropoda
- Clade: Pancrustacea
- Class: Insecta
- Order: Coleoptera
- Suborder: Polyphaga
- Infraorder: Staphyliniformia
- Family: Leiodidae
- Subfamily: Cholevinae
- Tribe: Ptomaphagini
- Genus: Adelopsis; Portevin, 1907

Synonyms
- Viruana Salgado Costas, 2013; Excelsiorella Salgado, 2008; Adelopsis (Iutururuca) Gnaspini, 1993; Iutururuca Gnaspini, 1993

Genus of beetles

Adelopsis is a genus of beetles of the family Leiodidae.

== Species ==
- Adelopsis acuminis Salgado, 2013
- Adelopsis acutipennis Salgado, 2013
- Adelopsis albipinna Gnaspini & Peck, 1996
- Adelopsis aloecuatoriana Salgado, 2008
- Adelopsis anceps Gnaspini & Peck, 2001
- Adelopsis aptera Salgado, 2010
- Adelopsis ascutellaris (Murray, 1856)
- Adelopsis aspera Jeannel, 1936
- Adelopsis asperoides Szymczakowski, 1963
- Adelopsis azuay Salgado, 2013
- Adelopsis azzalii Szymczakowski, 1975
- Adelopsis barbula Salgado, 2013
- Adelopsis bellator Szymczakowski, 1968
- Adelopsis benardi (Portevin, 1923)
- Adelopsis bifida Gnaspini & Peck, 2001
- Adelopsis bilobulata Salgado, 2010
- Adelopsis bioforestae Salgado, 2003
- Adelopsis brasiliensis Jeannel, 1936
- Adelopsis brevicollis Szymczakowski, 1975
- Adelopsis bruchi (Pic, 1926)
- Adelopsis brunnea Jeannel, 1936
- Adelopsis calarcensis Gnaspini & Peck, 2001
- Adelopsis camella Gnaspini & Peck, 2001
- Adelopsis capitanea Gnaspini & Peck, 2001
- Adelopsis carolinae Salgado, 2008
- Adelopsis catarina Salgado, 2005
- Adelopsis chapadaensis Salgado, 1999
- Adelopsis claudina Gnaspini & Peck, 2019
- Adelopsis confluens Gnaspini & Peck, 1996
- Adelopsis coronaria Gnaspini & Peck, 1996
- Adelopsis crassiflagellata Gnaspini & Peck, 2001
- Adelopsis curvata Salgado, 2011
- Adelopsis curvipes Salgado, 2005
- Adelopsis darwini Jeannel, 1936
- Adelopsis dehiscentis Salgado, 2003
- Adelopsis diabolica Gomyde & Gnaspini, 2019
- Adelopsis dumbo Gnaspini & Peck, 2001
- Adelopsis dybasi Gnaspini & Peck, 1996
- Adelopsis elaphas Gnaspini & Peck, 1996
- Adelopsis exiguus Peck & Cook, 2014XR
- Adelopsis galea Gnaspini & Peck, 1996
- Adelopsis gilli Gnaspini & Peck, 1996
- Adelopsis giraldoi Salgado, 2019
- Adelopsis grouvellei Jeannel, 1936
- Adelopsis guarani Salgado, 2010
- Adelopsis howdenorum Gnaspini & Peck, 1996
- Adelopsis insolita Szymczakowski, 1961
- Adelopsis jarmilae Gnaspini & Peck, 2001
- Adelopsis lamina Salgado, 2013
- Adelopsis latissima (Salgado, 2008)
- Adelopsis leo Gnaspini, 1993
- Adelopsis leticia Gnaspini & Peck, 2001
- Adelopsis linaresi Szymczakowski, 1969
- Adelopsis longipalpus Gnaspini & Peck, 2001
- Adelopsis longipenis Salgado, 2008
- Adelopsis luculenta Szymczakowski, 1963
- Adelopsis marinae Perreau, 2016
- Adelopsis miguelmonnei Gomyde & Gnaspini, 2026
- Adelopsis mixta Salgado, 2011
- Adelopsis mrazi Gnaspini & Peck, 2019
- Adelopsis onorei Salgado, 2003
- Adelopsis orcina Szymczakowski, 1975
- Adelopsis ovalis Jeannel, 1936
- Adelopsis palata Gnaspini & Peck, 2001
- Adelopsis perimeces Gnaspini & Peck, 1996
- Adelopsis peruviensis Blas, 1980
- Adelopsis pichinde Gnaspini & Peck, 2001
- Adelopsis picunche (Gnaspini, 1991)
- Adelopsis pileata Gnaspini & Peck, 1996
- Adelopsis piruapuera Gnaspini, 1993
- Adelopsis portevini Gnaspini & Peck, 2019
- Adelopsis procera Gnaspini & Peck, 2001
- Adelopsis protuberans Salgado, 2019
- Adelopsis pteromoria Szymczakowski, 1975
- Adelopsis punctata Salgado, 2010
- Adelopsis rhomboidea Salgado, 2013
- Adelopsis rostrata Gnaspini & Peck, 1996
- Adelopsis ruficollis (Portevin, 1903)
- Adelopsis sanlorenzo Gnaspini & Peck, 2001
- Adelopsis santamarta Gnaspini & Peck, 2001
- Adelopsis singularis Salgado, 2014
- Adelopsis sinuosa Gnaspini & Peck, 1996
- Adelopsis soacha Gnaspini & Peck, 2001
- Adelopsis stella Gnaspini & Peck, 1996
- Adelopsis szymczakowskii Gnaspini & Peck, 2019
- Adelopsis tandapi Salgado, 2005
- Adelopsis transversicornis Salgado, 2013
- Adelopsis triangulifer Szymczakowski, 1961
- Adelopsis tuberculata Salgado, 2003
- Adelopsis vallicola Gnaspini & Peck, 1996
- Adelopsis vulcania Salgado, 2016
- Adelopsis waclawi Gnaspini & Peck, 2019
- Adelopsis yasuni Salgado, 2013
