= Hydnobius substriatus =

Scientific classification
- Domain: Eukaryota
- Kingdom: Animalia
- Phylum: Arthropoda
- Class: Insecta
- Order: Coleoptera
- Suborder: Polyphaga
- Infraorder: Staphyliniformia
- Family: Leiodidae
- Genus: Hydnobius
- Species: H. substriatus

Binomial name
- Hydnobius substriatus LeConte, 1863

Synonyms
- Hydnobius curvidens LeConte, 1879; Hydnobius luggeri Hatch, 1927

Species of beetle

Hydnobius substriatus is a species of round fungus beetle in the family Leiodidae. It is found in North America.
