= Rozajella =

Scientific classification
- Kingdom: Animalia
- Phylum: Arthropoda
- Class: Insecta
- Order: Coleoptera
- Suborder: Polyphaga
- Infraorder: Staphyliniformia
- Family: Leiodidae
- Subfamily: Cholevinae
- Tribe: Leptodirini
- Genus: Rozajella; Curcic, Brajkovic & Curcic, 2007

Genus of insects

Rozajella is a genus of beetles belonging to the family Leiodidae. There are currently three described species, all of which are endemic to Montenegro.

== Species ==
- Rozajella deelemani Perreau & Pavićević, 2008 (Montenegro)
- Rozajella jovanvladimiri S.Ćurčić, Brajković & B.Ćurčić, 2007 (Montenegro)
- Rozajella madzgalji Njunjić, Schilthuizen, Pavićević & Perreau, 2017 (Montenegro)
