= Hydnobius kiseri =

Scientific classification
- Domain: Eukaryota
- Kingdom: Animalia
- Phylum: Arthropoda
- Class: Insecta
- Order: Coleoptera
- Suborder: Polyphaga
- Infraorder: Staphyliniformia
- Family: Leiodidae
- Genus: Hydnobius
- Species: H. kiseri

Binomial name
- Hydnobius kiseri Hatch, 1936

Species of beetle

Hydnobius kiseri is a species of round fungus beetle in the family Leiodidae. It is found in North America.
