= Platycholeus =

Scientific classification
- Kingdom: Animalia
- Phylum: Arthropoda
- Class: Insecta
- Order: Coleoptera
- Suborder: Polyphaga
- Infraorder: Staphyliniformia
- Family: Leiodidae
- Subfamily: Cholevinae
- Tribe: Leptodirini
- Genus: Platycholeus; Horn, 1880

Genus of beetles

Platycholeus is a genus of small carrion beetles in the family Leiodidae. There are at least two described species in Platycholeus.

== Species ==
These two species belong to the genus Platycholeus:

- Platycholeus leptinoides (Crotch, 1874)
- Platycholeus opacellus (Fall, 1909)
