= Macrohydnobius simulator =

Scientific classification
- Domain: Eukaryota
- Kingdom: Animalia
- Phylum: Arthropoda
- Class: Insecta
- Order: Coleoptera
- Suborder: Polyphaga
- Infraorder: Staphyliniformia
- Family: Leiodidae
- Genus: Macrohydnobius
- Species: M. simulator

Binomial name
- Macrohydnobius simulator (Brown, 1932)

Synonyms
- Hydnobius simulator Brown, 1932

Species of beetle

Macrohydnobius simulator is a species of round fungus beetle in the family Leiodidae. It is found in North America.
