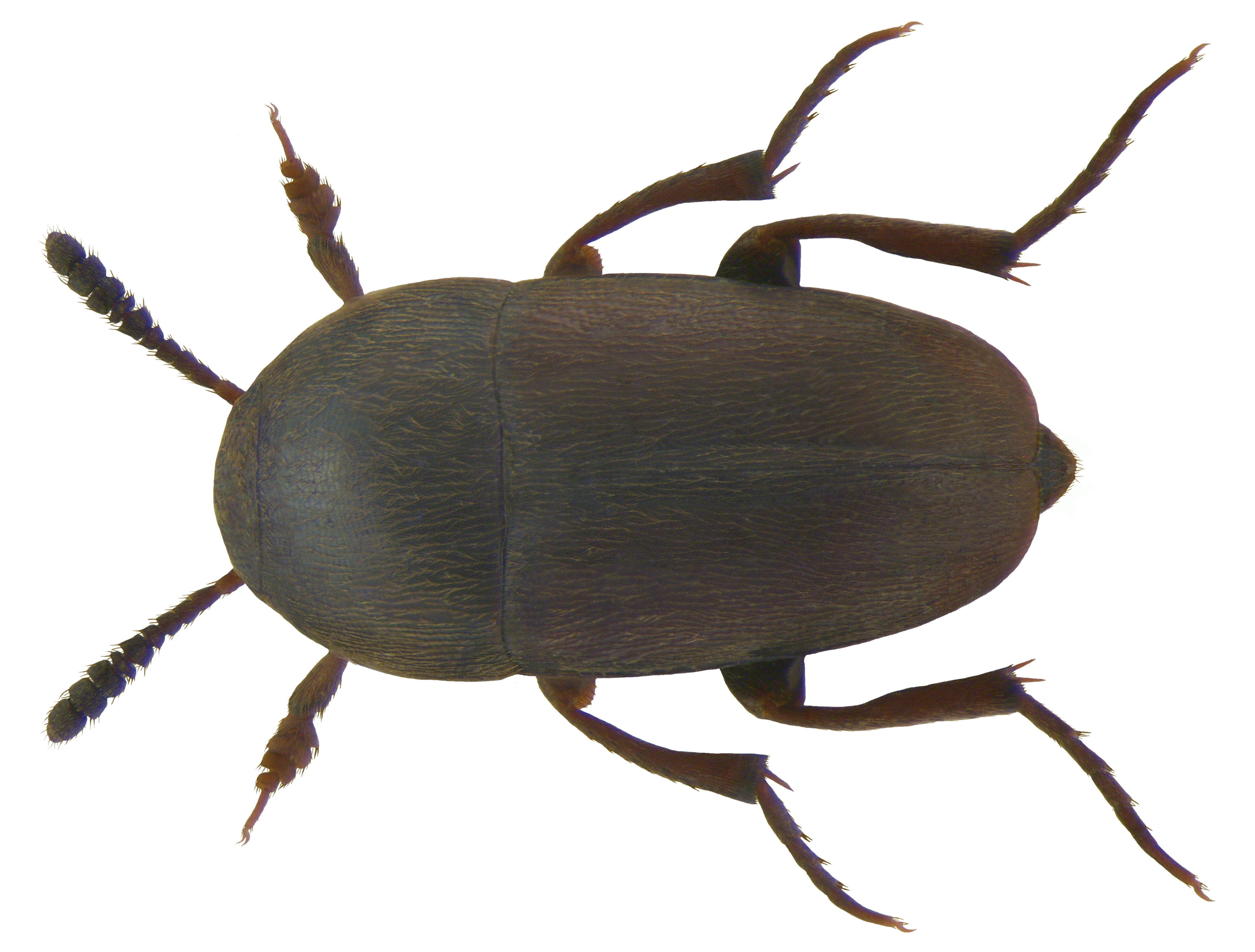
- Ptomaphagus subvillosus

Scientific classification
- Domain: Eukaryota
- Kingdom: Animalia
- Phylum: Arthropoda
- Class: Insecta
- Order: Coleoptera
- Suborder: Polyphaga
- Infraorder: Staphyliniformia
- Family: Leiodidae
- Subfamily: Cholevinae
- Tribe: Ptomaphagini

= Ptomaphagini =

Tribe of beetles

Ptomaphagini is a tribe of small carrion beetles in the family Leiodidae. There are about 14 genera and more than 110 described species in Ptomaphagini.

== Genera ==
These 14 genera belong to the tribe Ptomaphagini:

- Acrotrychiopsis Normand, 1946
- Adelopsis Portevin, 1907
- Adelopspeleon Salgado, 2012
- Amplexella Gnaspini, 1996
- Baryodirus Perreau, 2000
- Excelsiorella Salgado, 2008
- Pandania Szymczakowski, 1964
- Parapaulipalpina Gnaspini, 1996
- Paulipalpina Gnaspini & Peck, 1996
- Peckena Gnaspini, 1996
- Proptomaphaginus Szymczakowski, 1969
- Ptomaphaginus Portevin, 1914
- Ptomaphagus Hellwig, 1795
- Ptomaphaminus Perreau, 2000
