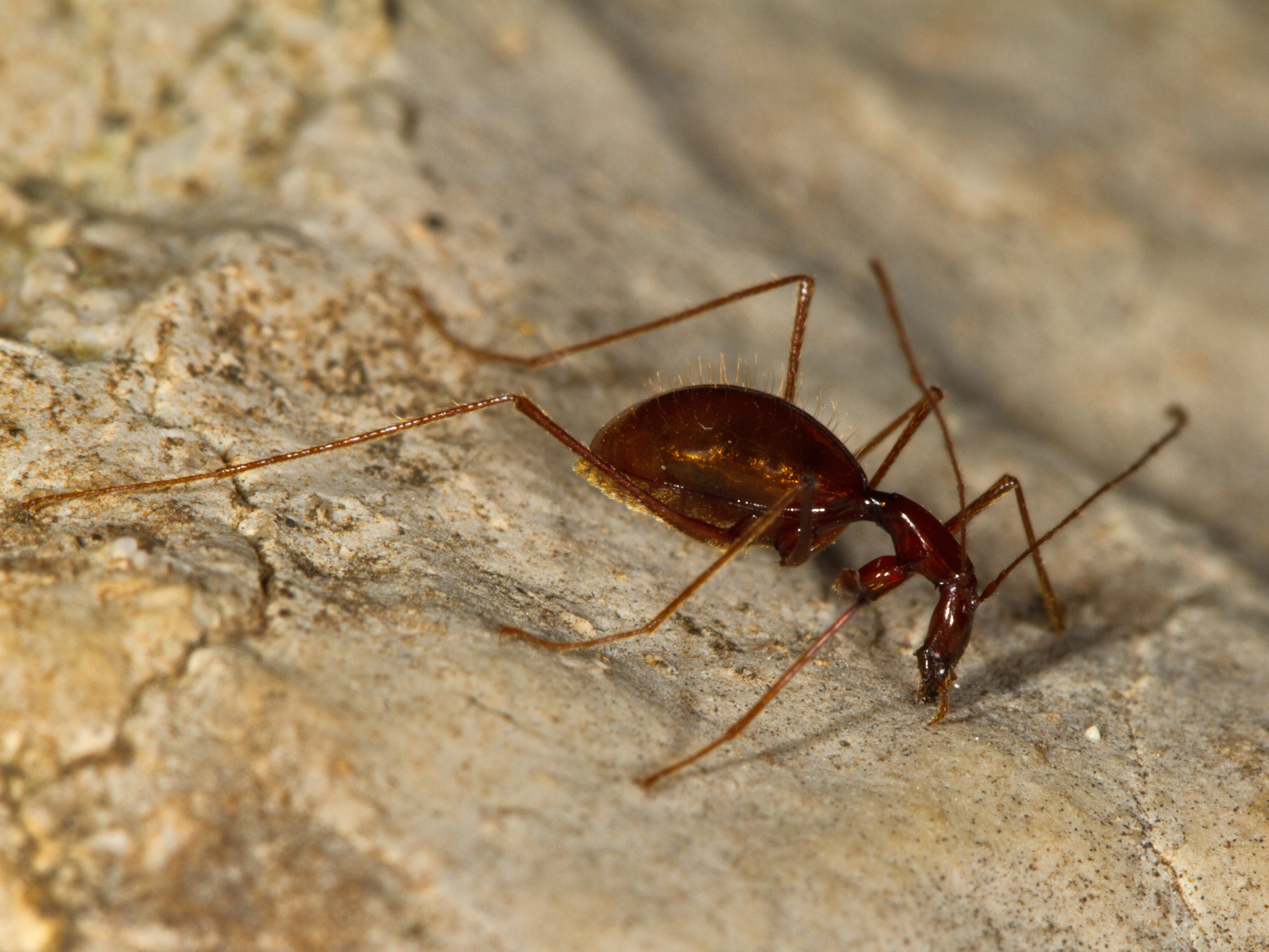
- Anthroherpon cylindricollis

Scientific classification
- Kingdom: Animalia
- Phylum: Arthropoda
- Clade: Pancrustacea
- Class: Insecta
- Order: Coleoptera
- Suborder: Polyphaga
- Infraorder: Staphyliniformia
- Family: Leiodidae
- Subfamily: Cholevinae
- Tribe: Leptodirini
- Genus: Anthroherpon; Reitter, 1889

= Anthroherpon =

Genus of beetles

Anthroherpon, also spelled Antroherpon, is a genus of beetles in the family Leiodidae.

== Species ==
According to Fauna Europaea:

- Anthroherpon brckoensis Giachino & Guéorguiev, 1933 (Bosnia & Hercegovina)
- Anthroherpon cecai Njunjić, Perreau & Pavićević, 2015 (Montenegro)
- Anthroherpon charon (Reitter, 1911) (Bosnia & Hercegovina)
- Anthroherpon cylindricollis (Apfelbeck, 1889) (Bosnia & Hercegovina)
- Anthroherpon elongatum Giachino & Guéorguiev, 1993 (Bosnia & Hercegovina)
- Anthroherpon erebus Breit, 1913 (Bosnia & Hercegovina)
- Anthroherpon ganglbaueri Apfelbeck, 1894 (Bosnia & Hercegovina)
- Anthroherpon garbellii Giachino & Vailati, 2005 (Albania)
- Anthroherpon gueorguievi Giachino & Vailati, 2005 (Montenegro)
- Anthroherpon harbichi Reitter, 1913 (Bosnia & Hercegovina)
- Anthroherpon hoermanni (Apfelbeck, 1889) (Bosnia & Hercegovina and Montenegro)
- Anthroherpon hossei Winkler, 1925 (Bosnia & Hercegovina)
- Anthroherpon latipenne Apfelbeck, 1907 (Albania, Bosnia & Hercegovina and Montenegro)
- Anthroherpon matulici Reitter, 1903 (Bosnia & Hercegovina, Croatia and Montenegro)
- Anthroherpon matzenaueri Apfelbeck, 1907 (Montenegro)
- Anthroherpon piesbergeni Zariquiey, 1927 (Montenegro)
- Anthroherpon pozi (Absolon, 1913) (Bosnia & Hercegovina)
- Anthroherpon primitivum Absolon, 1913 (Bosnia & Hercegovina and Croatia)
- Anthroherpon pygmaeum (Apfelbeck, 1889) (Bosnia & Hercegovina)
- Anthroherpon scutariensis Giachino & Guéorguiev, 1993 (Albania)
- Anthroherpon sinjajevina Njunjić, Perreau & Pavićević, 2015 (Montenegro)
- Anthroherpon stenocephalum Apfelbeck, 1901 (Bosnia & Hercegovina)
- Anthroherpon subalpinum Jeannel, 1924 (Bosnia & Hercegovina)
- Anthroherpon taxi Müller, 1913 (Albania, Bosnia & Hercegovina, Montenegro and Serbia)
- Anthroherpon udrzali Giachino & Vailati, 2005 (Montenegro)
- Anthroherpon weiratheri Reitter, 1913 (Bosnia & Hercegovina)
- Anthroherpon winneguthi Apfelbeck, 1919 (Bosnia & Hercegovina)
- Anthroherpon zariquieyi Jeannel, 1930 (Montenegro)

The genus has also contained Anthroherpon dombrowskii Apfelbeck, 1907, which has been moved to the genus Leptomeson.
