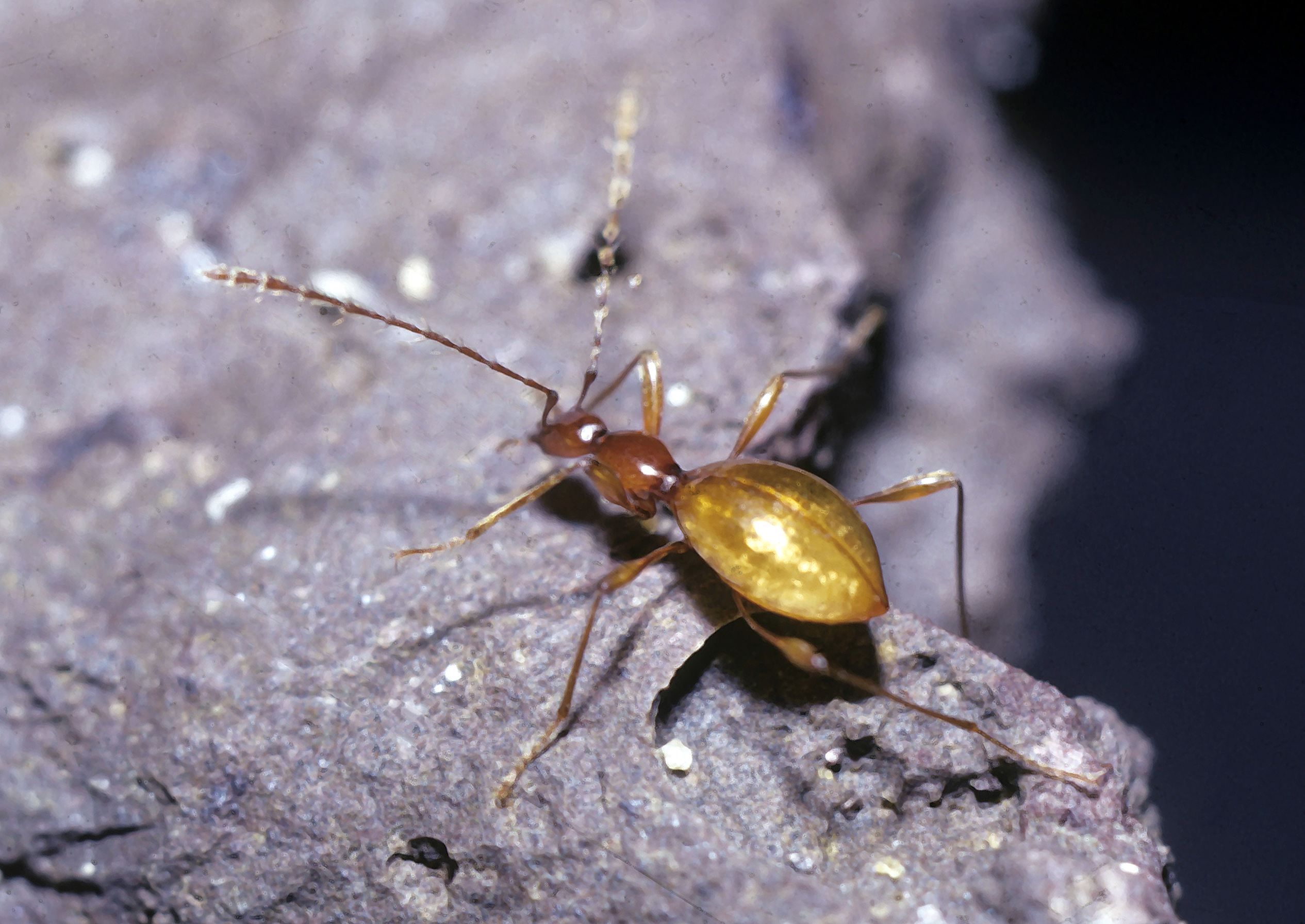

Conservation status
- Vulnerable (IUCN 2.3)

Scientific classification
- Domain: Eukaryota
- Kingdom: Animalia
- Phylum: Arthropoda
- Class: Insecta
- Order: Coleoptera
- Suborder: Polyphaga
- Infraorder: Staphyliniformia
- Family: Leiodidae
- Subfamily: Catopocerinae
- Genus: Glacicavicola
- Species: G. bathyscioides

Binomial name
- Glacicavicola bathyscioides Westcott, 1968

= Glacicavicola bathyscioides =

Species of beetle

Glacicavicola bathyscioides is a species of blind cave beetle in family Leiodidae. It is endemic to caves in the western United States.

== Description ==
Glacicavicola bathyscioides is a shiny, translucent, brownish-orange, ant-like beetle, approximately 6 mm long by 2mm wide. It has become well-adapted to the troglobitic lifestyle: it has long thin antennae covered in fine setae, and slender legs (also covered in setae) which allow it to easily traverse the difficult terrain present in its environment. The beetle is completely blind, lacking eyes and optic neuropiles. Its abdomen exhibits false physogastry, which means that it appears larger than it truly is, due to the enlarged dome-like elytra which covers the entire abdomen.

== Biology ==
Little is known about the biology of Glacicavicola bathyscioides due to its unique lifecycle and location. The beetles have been observed to feed on arthropod remains, as well as fungus, and it is speculated that they may eat bacteria as well. No larval form of the beetle has been observed. The beetles are suspected to have a lifecycle of around three years.

== Range ==
Glacicavicola bathyscioides was originally described by Richard Westcott in lava tube ice caves along the eastern Snake River Plain of Idaho. It has since been discovered in similar localities, including a limestone cave in Wyoming. The beetles have been associated with humid, cold cave temperatures and ice, and they die when exposed to higher temperatures, which limits their distribution.

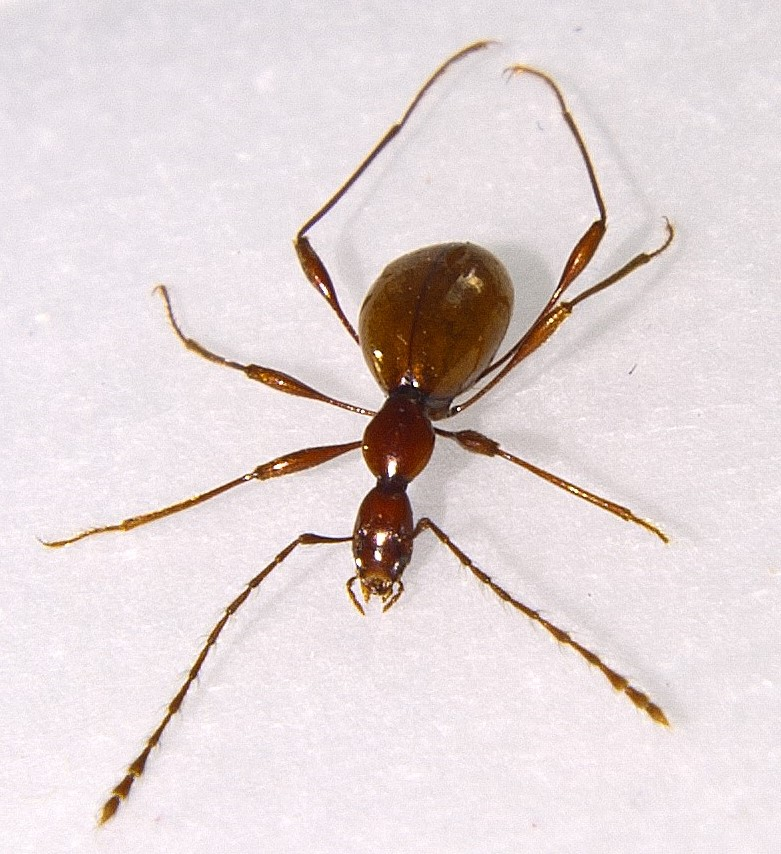
Dorsal aspect

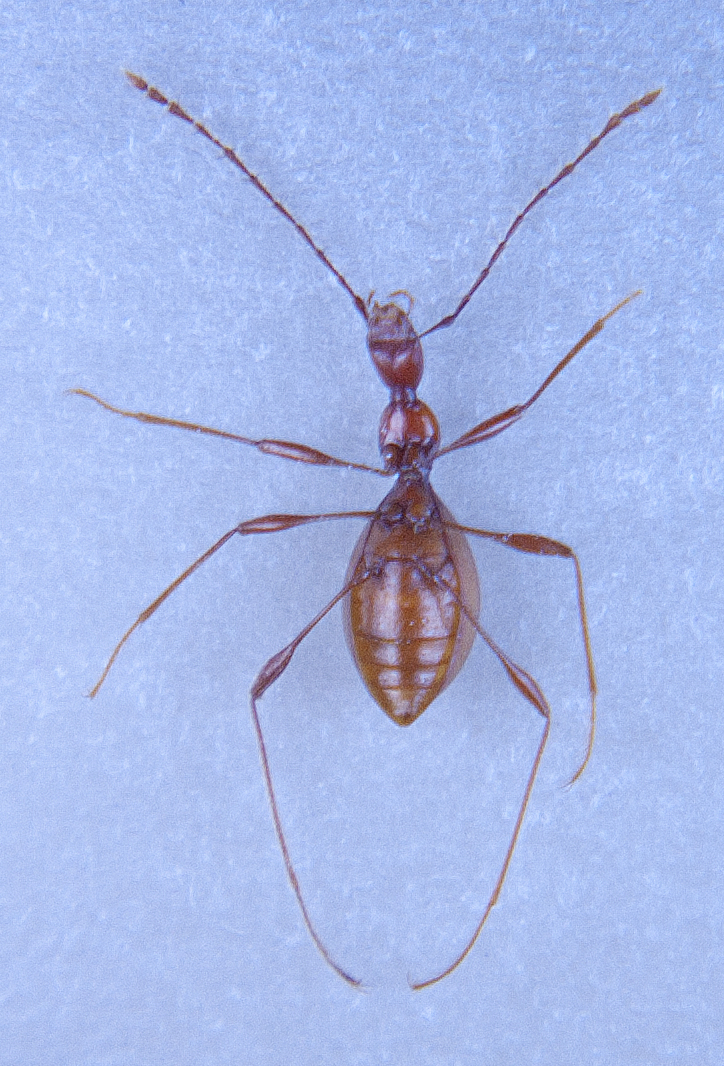
Ventral aspect

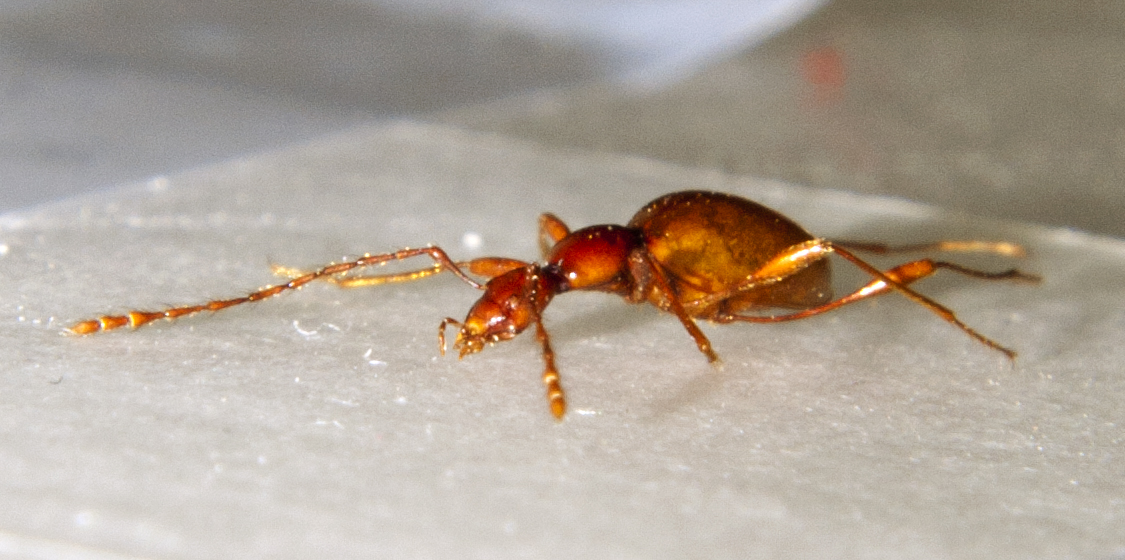
Left view

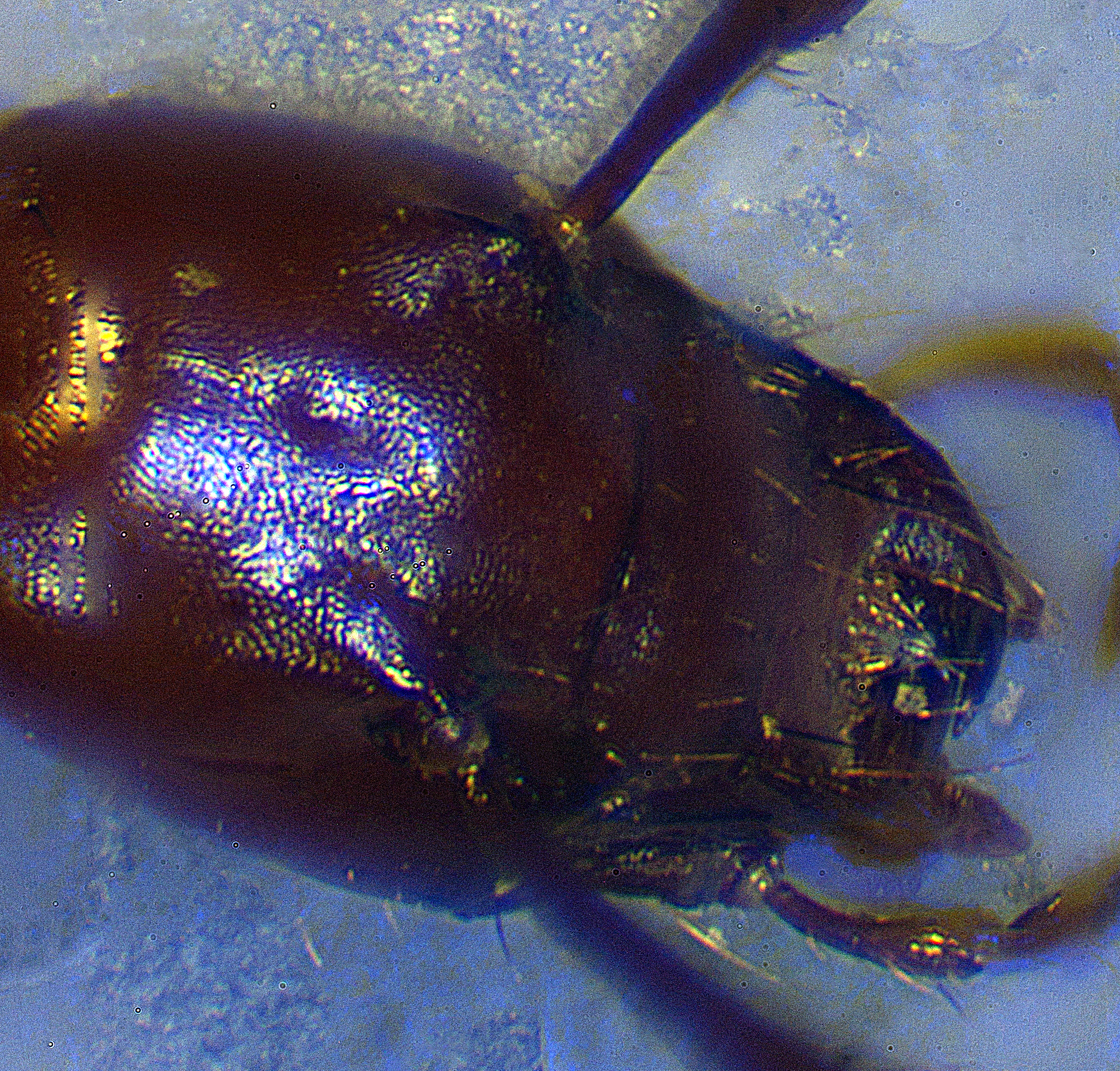
Head
