= Laneyriella andrijevicensis =

Scientific classification
- Kingdom: Animalia
- Phylum: Arthropoda
- Class: Insecta
- Order: Coleoptera
- Suborder: Polyphaga
- Infraorder: Staphyliniformia
- Family: Leiodidae
- Genus: Laneyriella
- Species: L. andrijevicensis

Binomial name
- Laneyriella andrijevicensis Jeannel, 1924
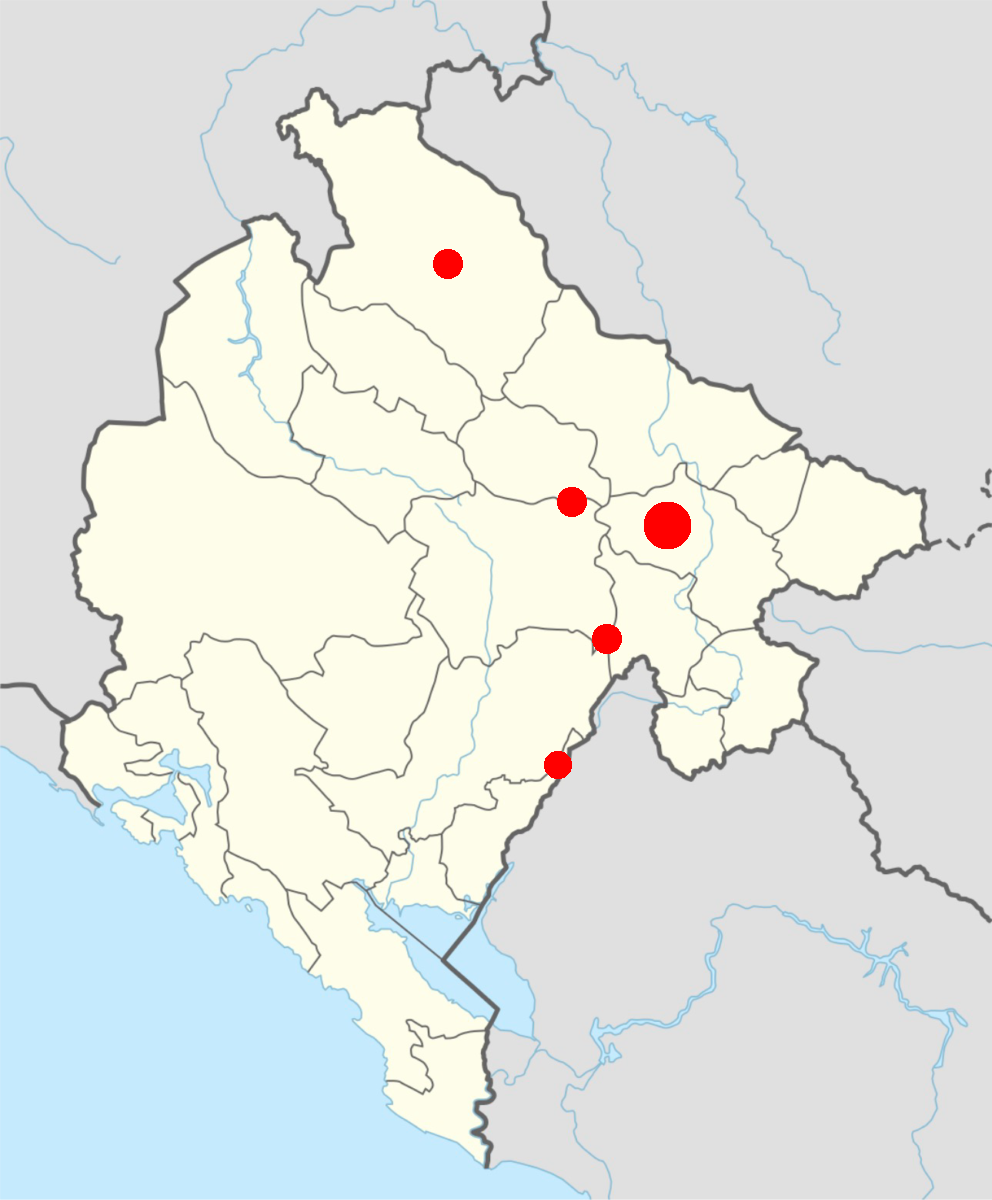

Synonyms
- Bathyscidius remyi Jeannel, 1934; Pholeuonella andrijevicensis E. Pretner, 1964

Species of beetle

Laneyriella andrijevicensis is a species of round fungus beetle found in Montenegro.

== Distribution ==
This species is endemic to northern Montenegro. It is documented from several localities across the Bjelasica mountain range and the Komovi massif, including caves like Brecanovića pećina, Velika Bracanovića pećina, Županjska pećina and the area around Biogradsko Jezero. The type specimen was collected near Gornje Selo in the Sandžak region.
