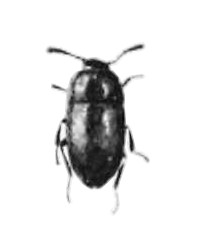
- Sciaphyes sibiricus

Scientific classification
- Kingdom: Animalia
- Phylum: Arthropoda
- Class: Insecta
- Order: Coleoptera
- Suborder: Polyphaga
- Infraorder: Staphyliniformia
- Family: Leiodidae
- Subfamily: Cholevinae
- Tribe: Sciaphyini
- Genus: Sciaphyes; Jeannel, 1924

= Sciaphyes =

Genus of beetles

Sciaphyes is a genus of small carrion beetles in the family Leiodidae.

== Species ==
These species belong to the genus Eucatops:

- Sciaphyes kawaharai Hoshina & Perreau, 2008
- Sciaphyes shestakovi Fresneda, Grebennikov & Ribera, 2011
- Sciaphyes sibiricus (Reitter, 1887)
- Sciaphyes japonicus Hayashi, Ogai & Nagasawa, 2015
