= Eucatops =

Scientific classification
- Kingdom: Animalia
- Phylum: Arthropoda
- Clade: Pancrustacea
- Class: Insecta
- Order: Coleoptera
- Suborder: Polyphaga
- Infraorder: Staphyliniformia
- Family: Leiodidae
- Subfamily: Cholevinae
- Tribe: Eucatopini
- Genus: Eucatops; Portevin, 1903

Genus of beetles

Eucatops is a genus of small carrion beetles in the family Leiodidae.

== Species ==
These species belong to the genus Eucatops:

- Eucatops andersoni
- Eucatops antennatus
- Eucatops apterus
- Eucatops brevistylis
- Eucatops crassicornis
- Eucatops curtus
- Eucatops curvipes
- Eucatops dentatus
- Eucatops equatorianus
- Eucatops femoratus
- Eucatops filifer
- Eucatops formicetorum
- Eucatops giganteus
- Eucatops glabricollis
- Eucatops globosus
- Eucatops granuliformis
- Eucatops grouvellei
- Eucatops haemorrhoidalis
- Eucatops incognitus
- Eucatops inermis
- Eucatops magnus
- Eucatops mexicanus
- Eucatops montanus
- Eucatops oblongus
- Eucatops obtusus
- Eucatops onorei
- Eucatops osa
- Eucatops ovalis
- Eucatops paramontanus
- Eucatops pecki
- Eucatops rossii
- Eucatops rufescens
- Eucatops solisi
- Eucatops spiralis
- Eucatops tenuisaccus
- Eucatops troglodytes
