= Platyhydnobius =

Scientific classification
- Kingdom: Animalia
- Phylum: Arthropoda
- Class: Insecta
- Order: Coleoptera
- Suborder: Polyphaga
- Infraorder: Staphyliniformia
- Family: Leiodidae
- Tribe: Sogdini
- Genus: Platyhydnobius; Peck & Cook, 2009

Type species
- Hydnobius arizonensis Horn, 1885

Genus of beetles

Platyhydnobius is a genus of beetles in the family Leiodidae. They have Nearctic and northern Neotropical distribution, from Honduras north to Alaska and Newfoundland.

Platyhydnobius are small beetles, measuring about 2.4–4.4 mm (0.094–0.173 in) in length (pronotum+elytra). The genus name refers to the broad and flat shape of the parameres in this genus, in combination with a reference to the genus Hydnobius.

== Species ==
There are eight recognized species:

- Platyhydnobius andersoni Peck and Cook, 2009
- Platyhydnobius arizonensis (Horn, 1885)
- Platyhydnobius bicolor Peck and Cook, 2009
- Platyhydnobius calvario Peck and Cook, 2009
- Platyhydnobius howdenorum Peck and Cook, 2009
- Platyhydnobius latigra Peck and Cook, 2009
- Platyhydnobius newtonorum Peck and Cook, 2009
- Platyhydnobius validus (Brown, 1932)
