= Oritocatopini =

Scientific classification
- Kingdom: Animalia
- Phylum: Arthropoda
- Class: Insecta
- Order: Coleoptera
- Suborder: Polyphaga
- Infraorder: Staphyliniformia
- Family: Leiodidae
- Subfamily: Cholevinae
- Tribe: Oritocatopini

Tribe of beetles

Oritocatopini is a tribe of small carrion beetles in the family Leiodidae.

== Genera ==
These three genera belong to the tribe Oritocatopini:

- Afrocatops
- Chappuisiotes
- Oritocatops
