= Macrohydnobius =

Scientific classification
- Domain: Eukaryota
- Kingdom: Animalia
- Phylum: Arthropoda
- Class: Insecta
- Order: Coleoptera
- Suborder: Polyphaga
- Infraorder: Staphyliniformia
- Family: Leiodidae
- Tribe: Sogdini
- Genus: Macrohydnobius; Peck & Cook, 2009

Genus of beetles

Macrohydnobius is a genus of round fungus beetles in the family Leiodidae. There are about six described species in Macrohydnobius.

== Species ==
These six species belong to the genus Macrohydnobius:

- Macrohydnobius contortus (Hatch, 1957)
- Macrohydnobius crestonensis (Hatch, 1957)
- Macrohydnobius matthewsii (Crotch, 1874)
- Macrohydnobius montanus Peck & Cook, 2009
- Macrohydnobius simulator (Brown, 1932)
- Macrohydnobius tibiocalcaris Peck & Cook, 2009
