= Nargus =

Scientific classification
- Kingdom: Animalia
- Phylum: Arthropoda
- Class: Insecta
- Order: Coleoptera
- Suborder: Polyphaga
- Infraorder: Staphyliniformia
- Family: Leiodidae
- Genus: Nargus; Thomson, 1867

Genus of beetles

Nargus is a genus of beetles belonging to the family Leiodidae.

Species:

- Nargus anisotomoides
- Nargus badius
- Nargus brunneus (Sturm, 1839)
- Nargus celli
- Nargus franki Perreau, 1997
