= Aphaobiella =

Scientific classification
- Kingdom: Animalia
- Phylum: Arthropoda
- Class: Insecta
- Order: Coleoptera
- Suborder: Polyphaga
- Infraorder: Staphyliniformia
- Family: Leiodidae
- Genus: Aphaobiella; Gueorguiev, 1976

Genus of beetles

Aphaobiella is a genus of beetles belonging to the family Leiodidae.

Species:

- Aphaobiella budnarlipoglavseki (Pretner, 1949)
- Aphaobiella kofleri Giachino, 2016
- Aphaobiella mlejneki Moravec, 1996
- Aphaobiella tisnicensis (Pretner, 1949)
