= Bithyniella =

Scientific classification
- Domain: Eukaryota
- Kingdom: Animalia
- Phylum: Arthropoda
- Class: Insecta
- Order: Coleoptera
- Suborder: Polyphaga
- Infraorder: Staphyliniformia
- Family: Leiodidae
- Genus: Bithyniella; Jeannel, 1955

Genus of beetles

Bithyniella is a genus of beetles belonging to the family Leiodidae.

Species:

- Bithyniella strinatii (Jeannel, 1955)
- Bithyniella viti (Rampini & Zoia, 1991)
