= Ceretophyes =

Scientific classification
- Domain: Eukaryota
- Kingdom: Animalia
- Phylum: Arthropoda
- Class: Insecta
- Order: Coleoptera
- Suborder: Polyphaga
- Infraorder: Staphyliniformia
- Family: Leiodidae
- Genus: Ceretophyes; Comas & Escola, 1989

Genus of beetles

Ceretophyes is a genus of beetles belonging to the family Leiodidae.

The species of this genus are found in Iberian Peninsula.

Species:

- Ceretophyes cenarroi (Español, 1955)
- Ceretophyes riberai (Español, 1967)
