= Xanthosphaera =

Scientific classification
- Kingdom: Animalia
- Phylum: Arthropoda
- Class: Insecta
- Order: Coleoptera
- Suborder: Polyphaga
- Infraorder: Staphyliniformia
- Family: Leiodidae
- Genus: Xanthosphaera; Fairmaire, 1859

Genus of beetles

Xanthosphaera is a genus of beetles belonging to the family Leiodidae.

Species:

- Xanthosphaera barnevillii Fairmaire, 1859
