= Aphaobius =

Scientific classification
- Kingdom: Animalia
- Phylum: Arthropoda
- Clade: Pancrustacea
- Class: Insecta
- Order: Coleoptera
- Suborder: Polyphaga
- Infraorder: Staphyliniformia
- Family: Leiodidae
- Genus: Aphaobius; Abeille, 1878

Genus of beetles

Aphaobius is a genus of beetles belonging to the family Leiodidae.

The species of this genus are found in Southern Europe.

== Species ==
Species:

- Aphaobius alphonsi Müller, 1914
- Aphaobius angusticollis Bognolo & Vailati, 2010
- Aphaobius brevicornis Mandl, 1940
