= Apocatops =

Scientific classification
- Domain: Eukaryota
- Kingdom: Animalia
- Phylum: Arthropoda
- Class: Insecta
- Order: Coleoptera
- Suborder: Polyphaga
- Infraorder: Staphyliniformia
- Family: Leiodidae
- Genus: Apocatops; Zwick, 1968

Genus of beetles

Apocatops is a genus of beetles belonging to the family Leiodidae.

Species:

- Apocatops monguzzii
- Apocatops nigrita
