= Dreposcia =

Scientific classification
- Kingdom: Animalia
- Phylum: Arthropoda
- Clade: Pancrustacea
- Class: Insecta
- Order: Coleoptera
- Suborder: Polyphaga
- Infraorder: Staphyliniformia
- Family: Leiodidae
- Genus: Dreposcia; Jeannel, 1922

Genus of beetles

Dreposcia is a genus of beetles belonging to the family Leiodidae.

The species of this genus are found in Europe.

Species:

- Dreposcia brevipalpis (Reitter, 1901)
- Dreposcia relicta Lohse, 1965
