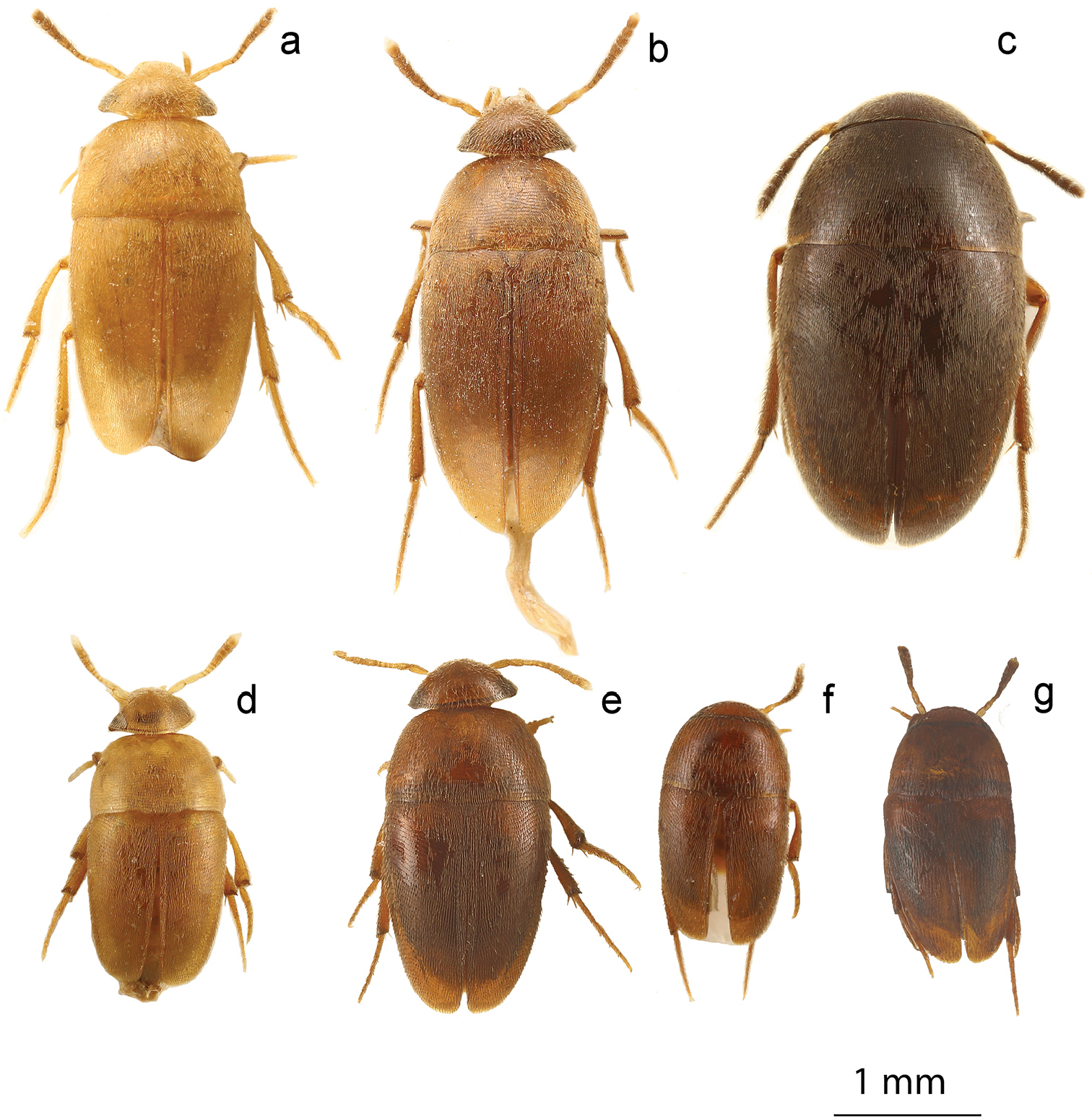

Scientific classification
- Kingdom: Animalia
- Phylum: Arthropoda
- Class: Insecta
- Order: Coleoptera
- Suborder: Polyphaga
- Infraorder: Staphyliniformia
- Family: Leiodidae
- Genus: Ptomaphaginus; Portevin, 1914

Diversity
- About 97+ species

= Ptomaphaginus =

Genus of beetles

Ptomaphaginus is a genus of beetles belonging to the family Leiodidae. It contains about 97 species worldwide. Most members live in caves or soil, thus eyes are absent or rudimentary. In 2008, a new species was discovered in the Sunda region. In 2017, two species in Japan were recorded, and 12 new species were discovered in China in 2015.

== Species ==
The following species are recognised in the genus Ptomaphaginus:

- Ptomaphaginus agostii
- Ptomaphaginus anas
- Ptomaphaginus angusticornis
- Ptomaphaginus apiculatus
- Ptomaphaginus assimilis
- Ptomaphaginus baliensis
- Ptomaphaginus bengalicola
- Ptomaphaginus bryanti
- Ptomaphaginus bryantioides
- Ptomaphaginus bucculentus
- Ptomaphaginus burckhardti
- Ptomaphaginus caroli
- Ptomaphaginus chapmani
- Ptomaphaginus cherrapunjeensis
- Ptomaphaginus cilipes
- Ptomaphaginus clibanarius
- Ptomaphaginus coronatus
- Ptomaphaginus dao
- Ptomaphaginus depequkri
- Ptomaphaginus flavicornis
- Ptomaphaginus fornicatus
- Ptomaphaginus franki
- Ptomaphaginus geigenmuellerae
- Ptomaphaginus giachinoi
- Ptomaphaginus gibberosus
- Ptomaphaginus giganteus
- Ptomaphaginus gracilis
- Ptomaphaginus guangxiensis
- Ptomaphaginus gutianshanicus
- Ptomaphaginus hamatus
- Ptomaphaginus heterotrichus
- Ptomaphaginus honestus
- Ptomaphaginus ishizuchiensis
- Ptomaphaginus jacobsoni
- Ptomaphaginus kinabaluensis
- Ptomaphaginus kosiensis
- Ptomaphaginus kurbatovi
- Ptomaphaginus lacertosus
- Ptomaphaginus laticornis
- Ptomaphaginus latimanus
- Ptomaphaginus latipes
- Ptomaphaginus leucodon
- Ptomaphaginus loeblianus
- Ptomaphaginus longitarsis
- Ptomaphaginus luoi
- Ptomaphaginus major
- Ptomaphaginus megalayanus
- Ptomaphaginus minimus
- Ptomaphaginus mirabilis
- Ptomaphaginus miyataorum
- Ptomaphaginus murphyi
- Ptomaphaginus newtoni
- Ptomaphaginus nipponensis
- Ptomaphaginus nitens
- Ptomaphaginus obtusus
- Ptomaphaginus okinawaensis
- Ptomaphaginus oribates
- Ptomaphaginus pallidicornis
- Ptomaphaginus palpalis
- Ptomaphaginus palpaloides
- Ptomaphaginus pecki
- Ptomaphaginus perreaui
- Ptomaphaginus pilipennis
- Ptomaphaginus pilipennoides
- Ptomaphaginus pingtungensis
- Ptomaphaginus piraster
- Ptomaphaginus portevini
- Ptomaphaginus quadricalcarus
- Ptomaphaginus riedeli
- Ptomaphaginus rubidus
- Ptomaphaginus rufus
- Ptomaphaginus rugosus
- Ptomaphaginus ruzickai
- Ptomaphaginus sabahensis
- Ptomaphaginus sauteri
- Ptomaphaginus scaber
- Ptomaphaginus scaphaner
- Ptomaphaginus schawalleri
- Ptomaphaginus shennongensis
- Ptomaphaginus shibatai
- Ptomaphaginus similipes
- Ptomaphaginus similis
- Ptomaphaginus sinuatus
- Ptomaphaginus smetanai
- Ptomaphaginus takaosanus
- Ptomaphaginus takashii
- Ptomaphaginus tarsalis
- Ptomaphaginus thieleni
- Ptomaphaginus tomellerii
- Ptomaphaginus trautneri
- Ptomaphaginus troglodytes
- Ptomaphaginus truncatus
- Ptomaphaginus turensis
- Ptomaphaginus wenboi
- Ptomaphaginus wuzhishanicus
- Ptomaphaginus yaeyamaensis
- Ptomaphaginus yui
