= Laneyriella =

Scientific classification
- Kingdom: Animalia
- Phylum: Arthropoda
- Class: Insecta
- Order: Coleoptera
- Suborder: Polyphaga
- Infraorder: Staphyliniformia
- Superfamily: Staphylinoidea
- Family: Leiodidae
- Genus: Laneyriella; Guéorguiev, 1976

Genus of beetles

Laneyriella is a genus of round fungus beetles found in Montenegro and neighbouring countries.

== Systematics ==
Genus Laneyriella currently consists of 7 species.

Laneyriella andrijevicensis Jeannel, 1924 (Montenegro)

Laneyriella ganglbaueri Apfelbeck, 1907 (Montenegro)

Laneyriella matchai Jeannel, 1924 (Bosnia & Hercegovina and Montenegro)

Laneyriella milotiana Reitter, 1918 (Albania)

Laneyriella scutariensis G. Müller, 1934 (Albania and Montenegro)

Laneyriella staudacheri G.Müller, 1934 (Croatia)

Laneyriella stussineri J.Müller, 1914 (Montenegro)
