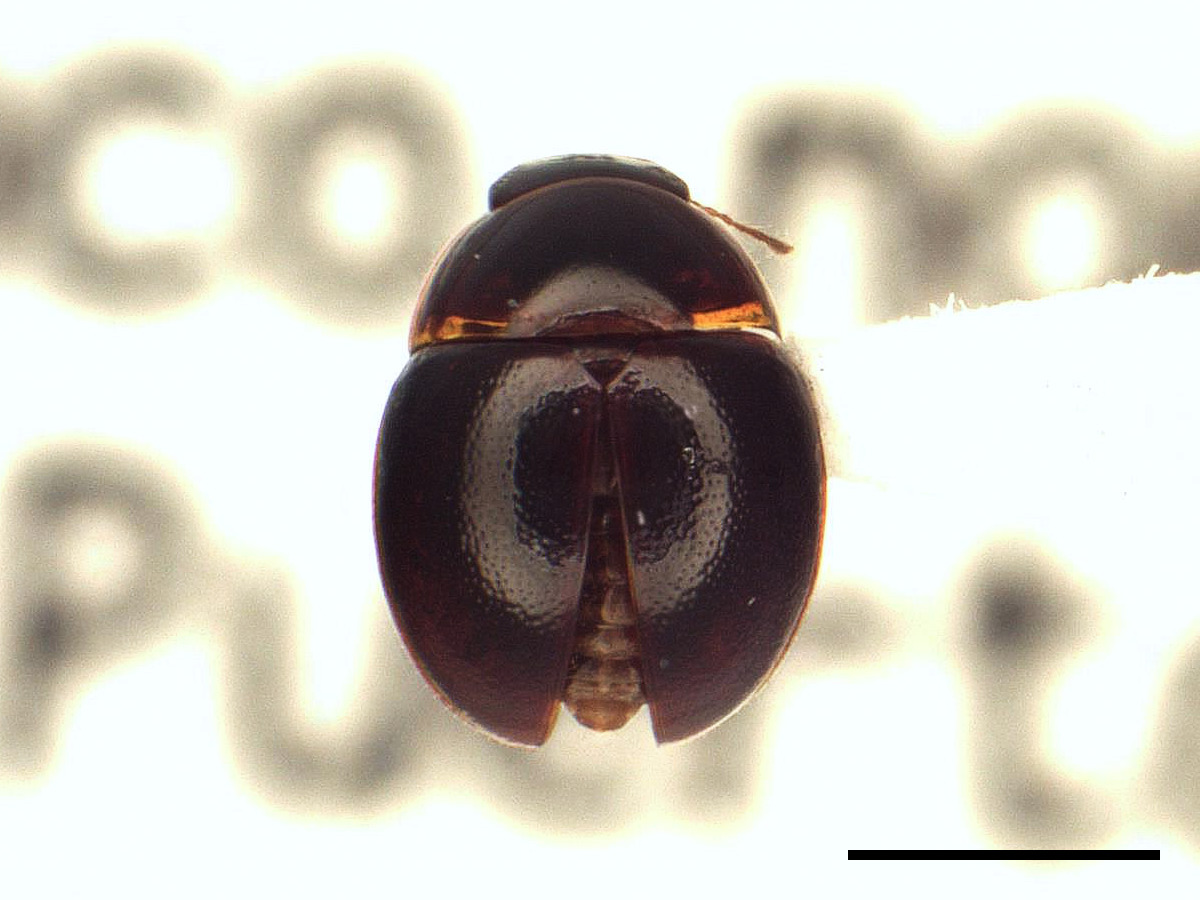
- Aglyptinus sp. from Dominican Republic

Scientific classification
- Kingdom: Animalia
- Phylum: Arthropoda
- Class: Insecta
- Order: Coleoptera
- Suborder: Polyphaga
- Infraorder: Staphyliniformia
- Family: Leiodidae
- Tribe: Scotocryptini
- Genus: Aglyptinus; Cockerell, 1906

= Aglyptinus =

Genus of beetles

Aglyptinus is a genus of round fungus beetles in the family Leiodidae. There are over forty described species in Aglyptinus.
