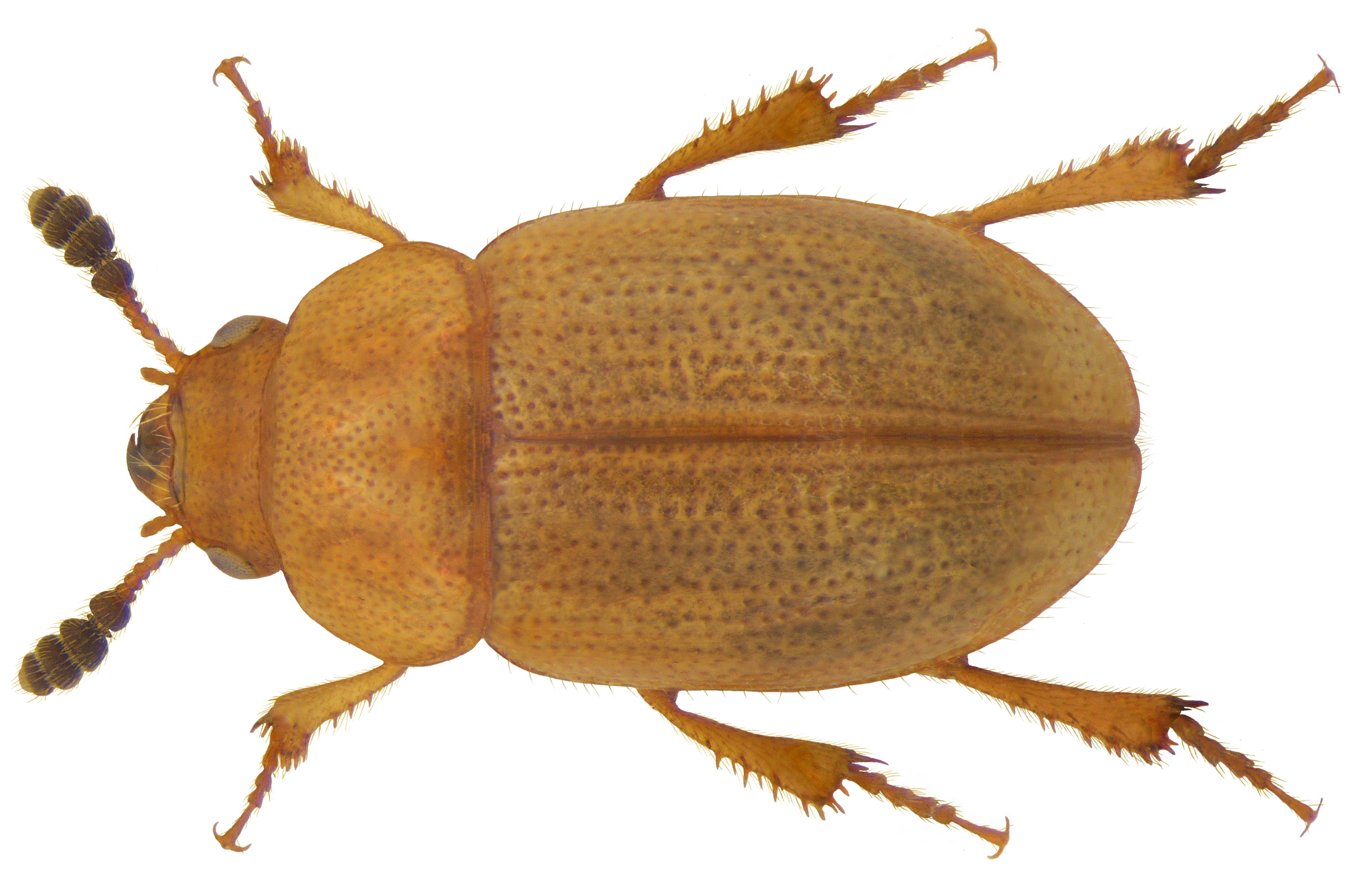
- Trichohydnobius (Sogda)

Scientific classification
- Kingdom: Animalia
- Phylum: Arthropoda
- Class: Insecta
- Order: Coleoptera
- Suborder: Polyphaga
- Infraorder: Staphyliniformia
- Family: Leiodidae
- Genus: Sogda; Lopatin, 1961

= Sogda =

Genus of beetles

Sogda is a genus of beetles belonging to the family Leiodidae.

The species of this genus are found in Europe and Northern America.

Species:

- Sogda ciliaris (Thomson, 1874)
- Sogda enigma Peck & Cook, 2009
