= Hydnobius =

Scientific classification
- Kingdom: Animalia
- Phylum: Arthropoda
- Class: Insecta
- Order: Coleoptera
- Suborder: Polyphaga
- Infraorder: Staphyliniformia
- Family: Leiodidae
- Tribe: Sogdini
- Genus: Hydnobius; Schmidt, 1841

Genus of beetles

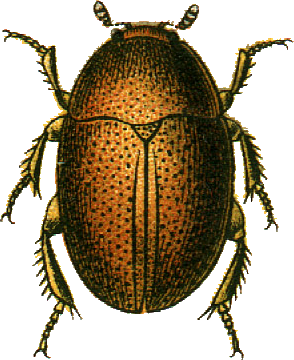
Hydnobius punctatus

Hydnobius is a genus of round fungus beetles in the family Leiodidae. There are about seven described species in Hydnobius.

== Species ==
These seven species belong to the genus Hydnobius:

- Hydnobius acarinus Peck and Cook, 2009
- Hydnobius autumnalis Peck and Cook, 2009
- Hydnobius kiseri Hatch, 1936
- Hydnobius laticeps Notman, 1920
- Hydnobius longidens LeConte, 1879
- Hydnobius pumilus LeConte, 1879
- Hydnobius substriatus LeConte, 1863
