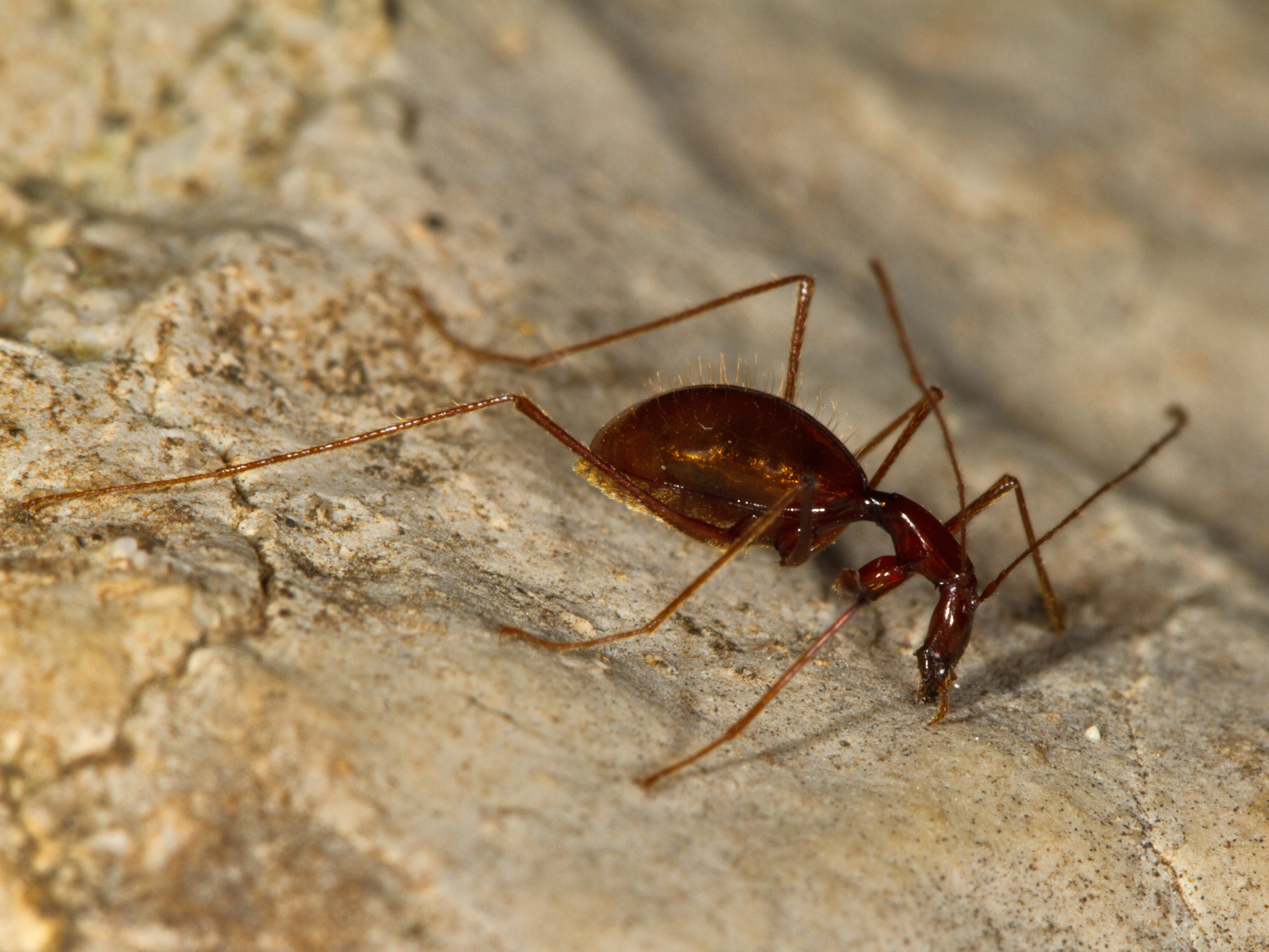
- Anthroherpon cylindricollis

Scientific classification
- Domain: Eukaryota
- Kingdom: Animalia
- Phylum: Arthropoda
- Class: Insecta
- Order: Coleoptera
- Suborder: Polyphaga
- Infraorder: Staphyliniformia
- Family: Leiodidae
- Subfamily: Cholevinae
- Tribe: Leptodirini

Diversity
- at least 190 genera

= Leptodirini =

Tribe of beetles

Leptodirini is a tribe of small carrion beetles in the family Leiodidae. There are more than 190 genera and 750 described species in Leptodirini.

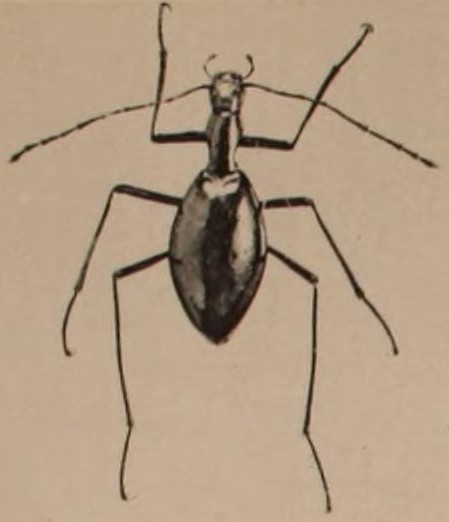
Astagobius angustatus

== See also ==
- List of Leptodirini genera
