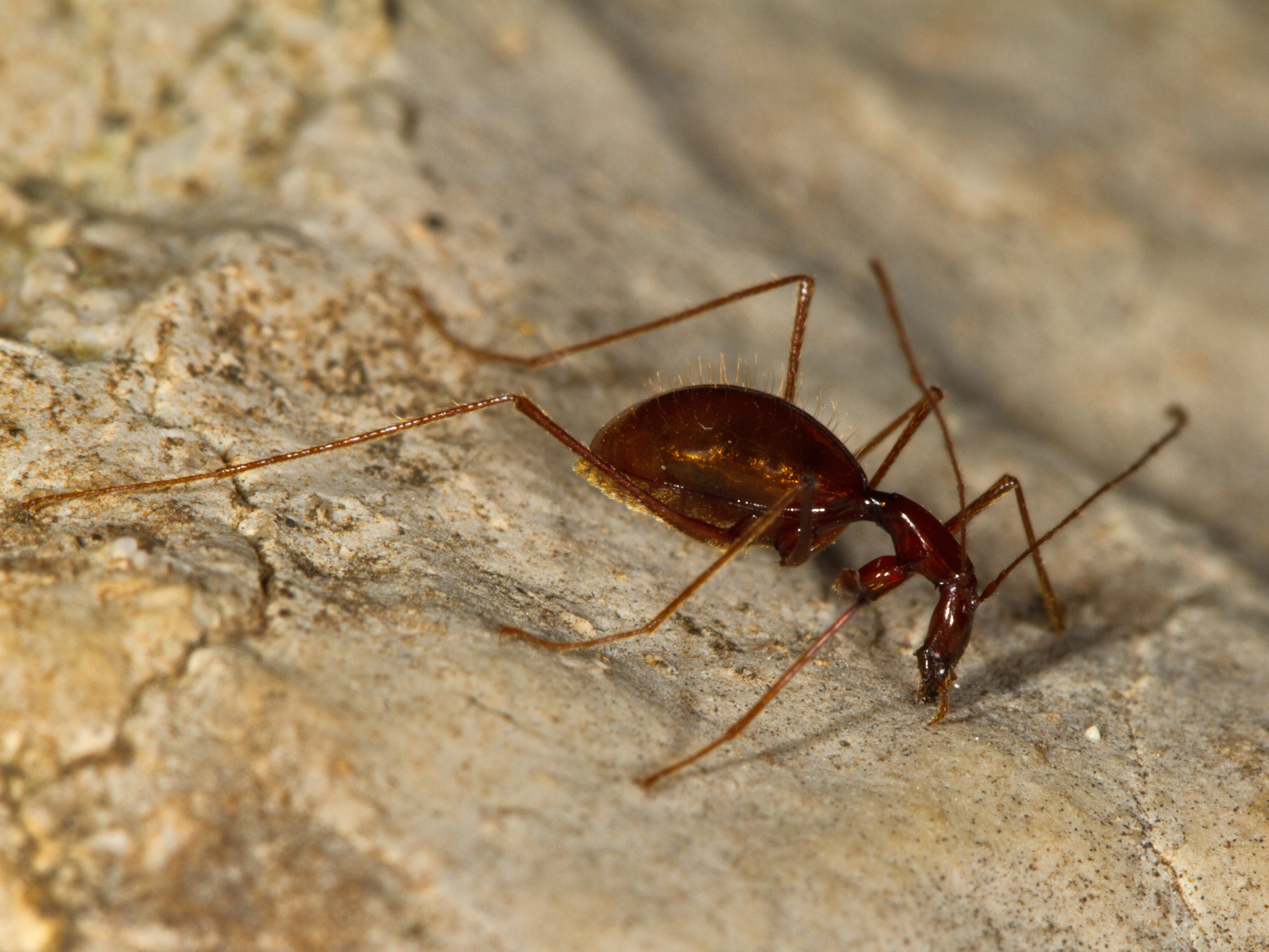
- Anthroherpon cylindricollis

Scientific classification
- Domain: Eukaryota
- Kingdom: Animalia
- Phylum: Arthropoda
- Class: Insecta
- Order: Coleoptera
- Suborder: Polyphaga
- Infraorder: Staphyliniformia
- Family: Leiodidae
- Subfamily: Cholevinae; Kirby, 1837

Tribes
- Anemadini; Cholevini; Eucatopini; Leptodirini; Oritocatopini; Ptomaphagini; Sciaphyini

Diversity
- at least 260 genera

= Cholevinae =

Subfamily of beetles

Cholevinae is a subfamily of small carrion beetles in the family Leiodidae. There are more than 260 genera and 1,100 described species in Cholevinae.

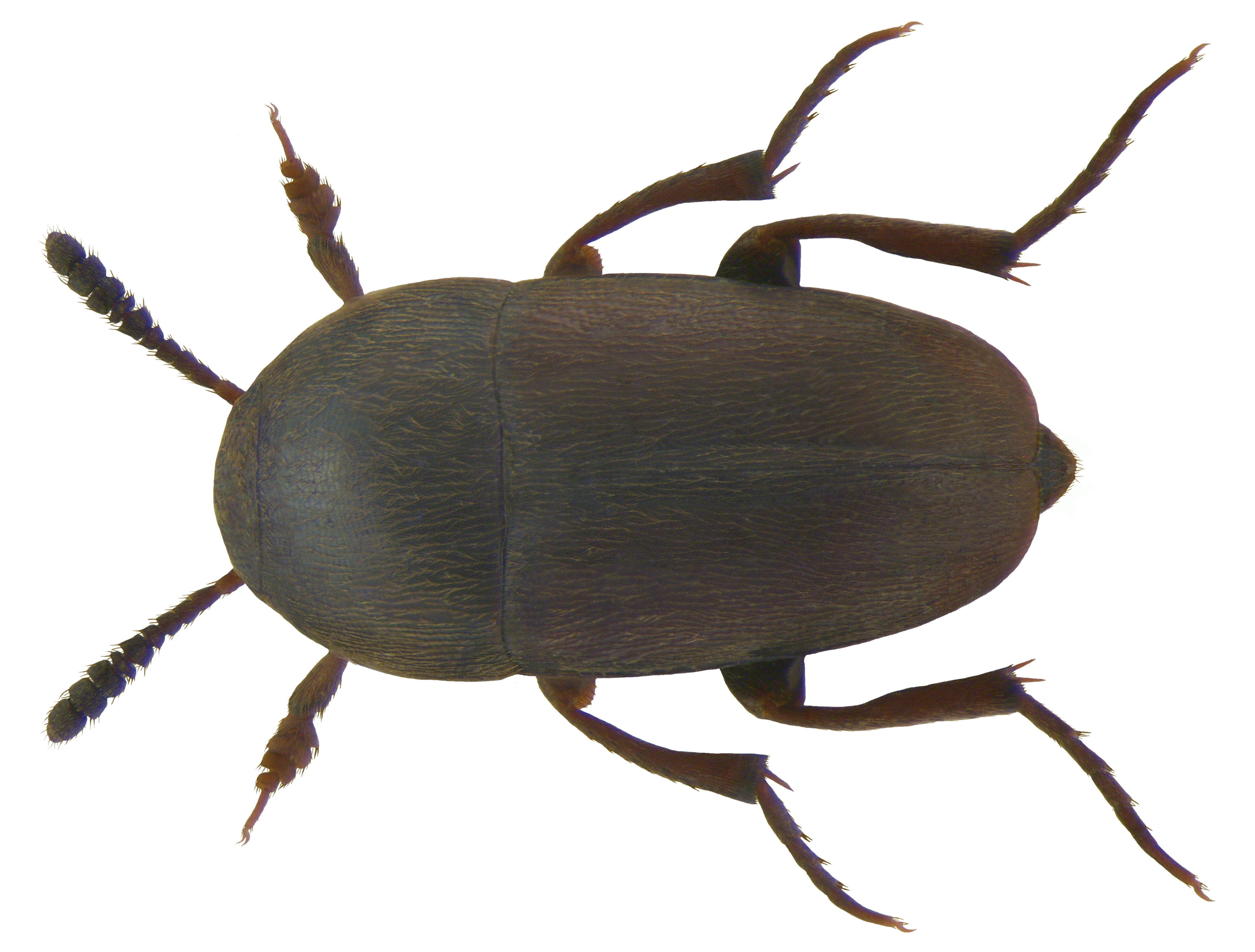
Ptomaphagus subvillosus

== See also ==
For a list of genera in Cholevinae, see List of Leiodidae genera.
