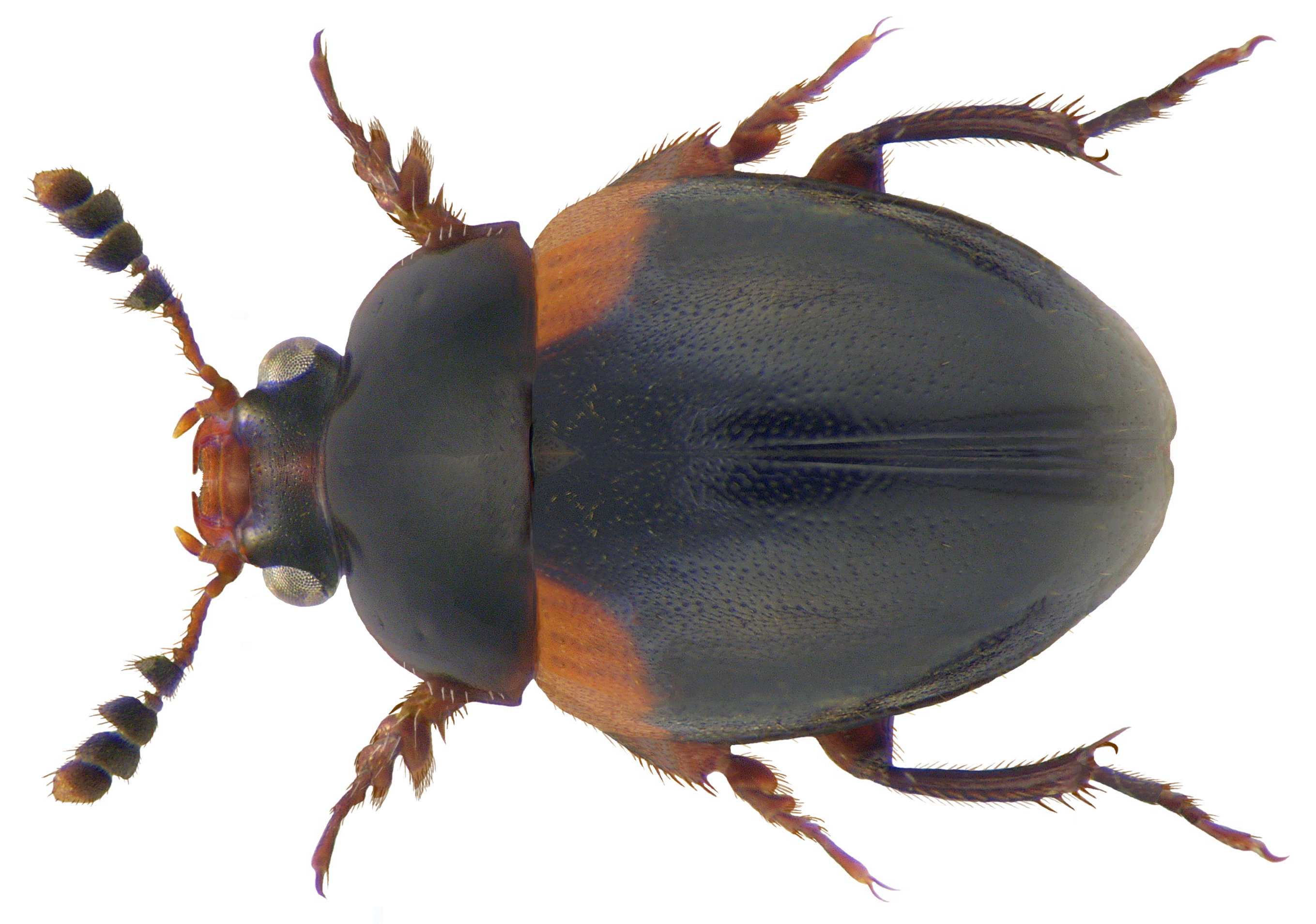
- Anisotoma humeralis

Scientific classification
- Kingdom: Animalia
- Phylum: Arthropoda
- Clade: Pancrustacea
- Class: Insecta
- Order: Coleoptera
- Suborder: Polyphaga
- Infraorder: Staphyliniformia
- Superfamily: Staphylinoidea
- Family: Leiodidae; Fleming, 1821

Subfamilies
- Camiarinae Jeannel, 1911; Catopocerinae Hatch, 1927; Cholevinae Kirby, 1837; Coloninae Horn, 1880; Leiodinae Fleming, 1821; Platypsyllinae Ritsema, 1869

Diversity
- at least 380 genera

= Leiodidae =

Leiodidae Temporal range: Tithonian–Recent

Family of beetles

Catops picipes on beech leaf

Leiodidae is a family of beetles with around 3800 described species found worldwide. Members of this family are commonly called round fungus beetles due to the globular shape of many species, although some are more elongated in shape. They are generally small or very small beetles (less than 10 mm in length) and many (but not all) species have clubbed antennae.

Members of the family are generally detritivorous or scavengers feeding on carrion or decaying organic matter like dung, or are specialised on feeding on specific types of fungus. Many species have reduced wings, with about half of all described species being flightless.

The oldest fossil of the family is Mesagyrtoides from Shar-Teg, Mongolia, dating the Late Jurassic (Tithonian). Members of modern subfamilies appear during the Cretaceous, with Cretaceous members of the family being primarily known from Burmese amber.

== See also ==
- List of Leiodidae genera
