= List of Leiodes species =

This is a list of 113 species in Leiodes, a genus of round fungus beetles in the family Leiodidae.

== Leiodes species ==
- Leiodes alesi Baranowski, 1993^{i g}
- Leiodes alternata Melsheimer, 1844^{i g}
- Leiodes antennata (Fall, 1910)^{i g}
- Leiodes appalachiana Baranowski, 1993^{i g b}
- Leiodes assimilis (LeConte, 1850)^{i g b}
- Leiodes assimiloides Baranowski, 1993^{i g}
- Leiodes austriacus Daffner, 1983^{g}
- Leiodes autumnalis Baranowski, 1993^{i g}
- Leiodes badia (Sturm, 1807)^{g}
- Leiodes bicolor (Schmidt, 1841)^{g}
- Leiodes brandisi Holdhaus, 1902^{g}
- Leiodes brunnea (Sturm, 1807)^{g}
- Leiodes calcarata (Erichson, 1845)^{g}
- Leiodes californica Baranowski, 1993^{i g}
- Leiodes campbelli Baranowski, 1993^{i g}
- Leiodes canariensis (Wollaston, 1863)^{g}
- Leiodes carpathicus (Ganglbauer, 1896)^{g}
- Leiodes cascadensis Baranowski, 1993^{i g}
- Leiodes castanescens (Fairmaire, 1881)^{g}
- Leiodes ciliaris (Schmidt, 1841)^{g}
- Leiodes cinnamomea (Panzer, 1793)^{g}
- Leiodes collaris (LeConte, 1850)^{i g}
- Leiodes conferta (LeConte, 1866)^{i g}
- Leiodes conjuncta Baranowski, 1993^{i g}
- Leiodes contaminabilis Baranowski, 1993^{i g}
- Leiodes curvata (Mannerheim, 1853)^{i g}
- Leiodes difficilis (Horn, 1880)^{i g}
- Leiodes dilutipes (Sahlberg, 1903)^{g}
- Leiodes discontignyi (C.Brisout de Barneville, 1867)^{g}
- Leiodes distinguendus (Fairmaire, 1856)^{g}
- Leiodes dubia (Fabricius, 1792)^{g}
- Leiodes ferruginea (Fabricius, 1787)^{g}
- Leiodes flavescens (Schmidt, 1841)^{g}
- Leiodes flavicornis (Brisout de Barneville, 1884)^{g}
- Leiodes fracta (Seidlitz, 1874)^{g}
- Leiodes furva (Erichson, 1845)^{g}
- Leiodes gallica Reitter, 1884^{g}
- Leiodes ganglbaueri (Holdhaus, 1902)^{g}
- Leiodes graecus Svec, 1993^{g}
- Leiodes graefi Svec, 1994^{g}
- Leiodes grandipes Baranowski, 1993^{i g}
- Leiodes grossa Hatch, 1957^{i g}
- Leiodes gyllenhalii Stephens, 1829^{g}
- Leiodes hiemalis (Abeille de Perrin, 1901)^{g}
- Leiodes horni Hatch, 1957^{i g b}
- Leiodes hybrida (Erichson, 1845)^{g}
- Leiodes impersonata Brown, 1932^{i g}
- Leiodes impressa Baranowski, 1993^{i g}
- Leiodes inordinata (J.Sahlberg, 1898)^{g}
- Leiodes interjecta Baranowski, 1993^{i g}
- Leiodes javorniki (Hlisnikovsky, 1964)^{g}
- Leiodes karinae Baranowski, 1993^{i g}
- Leiodes klapperichi Daffner, 1983^{g}
- Leiodes lateritia (Mannerheim, 1852)^{i g}
- Leiodes litura Stephens, 1832^{g}
- Leiodes longipes (Schmidt, 1841)^{g}
- Leiodes longitarsis Baranowski, 1993^{i g}
- Leiodes lostine (Hatch, 1957)^{i g}
- Leiodes lucens (Fairmaire, 1855)^{g}
- Leiodes lunicollis (Rye, 1872)^{g}
- Leiodes macropus (Rye, 1873)^{g}
- Leiodes maculicollis (Rye, 1875)^{g}
- Leiodes merkeliana (Horn, 1895)^{i g}
- Leiodes morula (LeConte, 1859)^{i g}
- Leiodes multidentata Baranowski, 1993^{i g}
- Leiodes neglecta Baranowski, 1993^{i g b}
- Leiodes nigrita (Schmidt, 1841)^{g}
- Leiodes nitidula (Erichson, 1845)^{g}
- Leiodes nitidus (Reitter, 1884)^{g}
- Leiodes obesa (Schmidt, 1841)^{g}
- Leiodes oblonga (Erichson, 1845)^{g}
- Leiodes obscura (Fairmaire & Coquerel, 1859)^{g}
- Leiodes oceanicus (Wollaston, 1864)^{g}
- Leiodes opacipennis (Fall, 1910)^{i g}
- Leiodes pacifica Baranowski, 1993^{i g}
- Leiodes pallens (Sturm, 1807)^{g}
- Leiodes paludicola (Crotch, 1874)^{i g}
- Leiodes picea (Panzer, 1797)^{g}
- Leiodes polita (Marsham, 1802)^{g}
- Leiodes puncticollis (Thomson, 1862)^{i g b}
- Leiodes punctostriata Kirby, 1837^{i g b}
- Leiodes punctulata (Gyllenhal, 1810)^{i g}
- Leiodes pygmaea Baranowski, 1993^{i g}
- Leiodes quebecensis Baranowski, 1993^{i g}
- Leiodes rhaetica (Erichson, 1845)^{i g}
- Leiodes rosai Daffner, 1983^{g}
- Leiodes rotundata (Erichson, 1845)^{g}
- Leiodes rubiginosa (Schmidt, 1841)^{g}
- Leiodes ruficollis (J.Sahlberg, 1898)^{g}
- Leiodes rufipennis (Paykull, 1798)^{g}
- Leiodes rufipes (Gebler, 1833)^{i g b}
- Leiodes rufobasalis Baranowski, 1993^{i g}
- Leiodes rugosa Stephens, 1829^{g}
- Leiodes scita Erichson, 1845^{g}
- Leiodes serripes Hatch, 1936^{i g}
- Leiodes sierranevadae Baranowski, 1993^{i g}
- Leiodes silesiaca (Kraatz, 1852)^{g}
- Leiodes similis (Fall, 1910)^{i g}
- Leiodes skalitzkyi (Ganglbauer, 1899)^{g}
- Leiodes soerenssoni Baranowski, 1993^{i g}
- Leiodes sparreschneideri Strand, 1943^{g}
- Leiodes sphaerula Baranowski, 1993^{i g}
- Leiodes stephani Baranowski, 1993^{i g}
- Leiodes strigata (LeConte, 1850)^{i g}
- Leiodes strigipennis Daffner, 1983^{g}
- Leiodes subconvexus Daffner, 1983^{g}
- Leiodes subtilicornis Baranowski, 1993^{i g}
- Leiodes subtilis (Reitter, 1885)^{g}
- Leiodes tauricus (Breit, 1917)^{g}
- Leiodes triepkei (Schmidt, 1841)^{i g}
- Leiodes valida (Horn, 1880)^{i g}
- Leiodes variipennis Baranowski, 1993^{i g}
- Leiodes vladimiri (Fleischer, 1906)^{g}

Data sources: i = ITIS, c = Catalogue of Life, g = GBIF, b = Bugguide.net
