= Dark Peak =

Area of the Peak District, England

Coordinates: 53.4°N 1.8°W

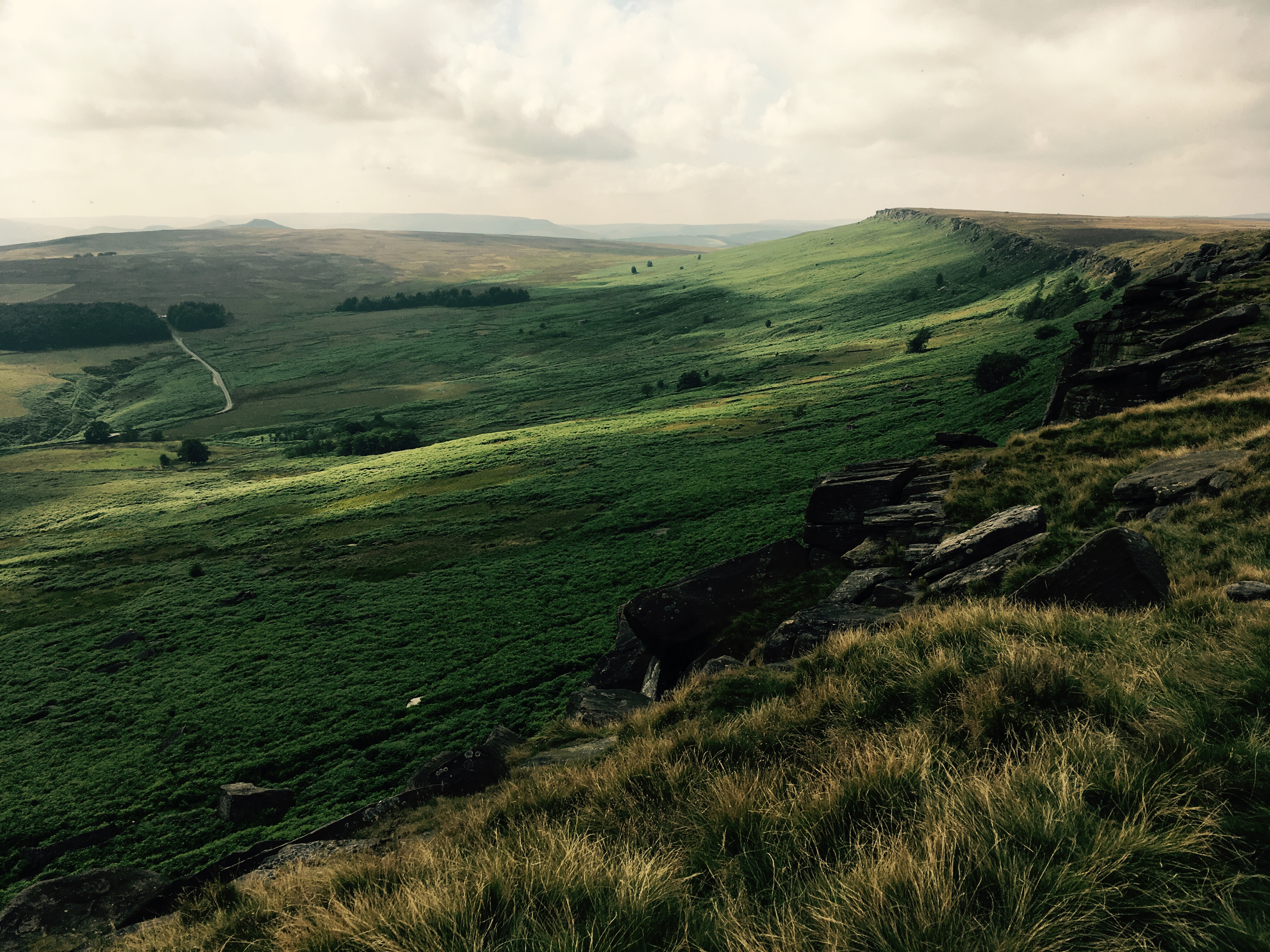
Dark Peak landscape seen from Stanage Edge

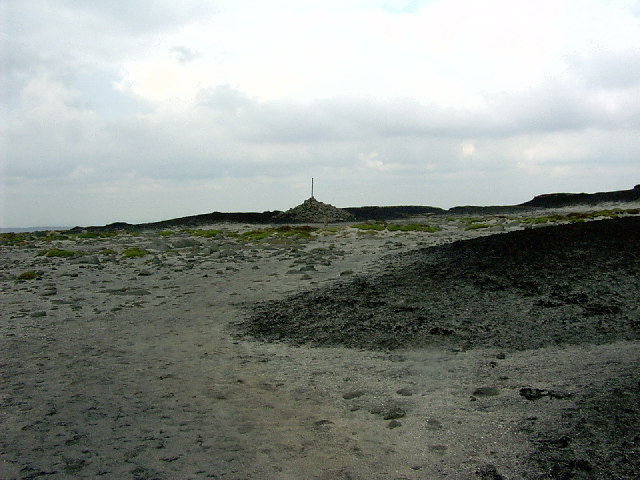
The summit of Bleaklow, second highest hill in the Dark Peak

The Dark Peak is the higher and wilder part of the Peak District in England, mostly forming the northern section but also extending south into its eastern and western margins. It is mainly in Derbyshire but parts are in Staffordshire, Cheshire, Greater Manchester, West Yorkshire and South Yorkshire.

It gets its name because (in contrast to the White Peak) the underlying limestone is covered by a cap of Millstone Grit sandstones with softer shale underneath, meaning that in winter the soil is almost always saturated with water. The land is thus largely uninhabited moorland plateaux where almost any depression is filled with sphagnum bogs and black peat. The High Peak is an alternative name for the Dark Peak, but High Peak is also the name of an administrative district of Derbyshire which includes part of the White Peak.

The areas of Millstone Grit form an 'inverted horseshoe' around the lower uncapped limestone areas of the White Peak, enclosing it to the west, north and east. Hence the Dark Peak is said to cover the higher, northern moors between the Hope Valley to the south and the Tame Valley, Standedge and Holme Valley to the north, separating it from the South Pennines, the Western Moors stretching south to near the Churnet Valley, and the Eastern Moors southwards towards Matlock. The Dark Peak is one of 159 National Character Areas defined by Natural England; as defined by Natural England, the Dark Peak NCA covers 86,604 hectares (334 sq mi) and includes the northern block of hills approximately bounded by Marsden, Stocksbridge, Hathersage and Chapel-en-le-Frith, plus the eastern moors between Hathersage and Matlock, but excludes the western moors between Chapel and the Churnet Valley (which it places in NCA 53, the South West Peak), and the area around Glossop (in NCA 54, Manchester Pennine Fringe).

An area of 31,852 hectares (123 sq mi) is designated as the Dark Peak Site of Special Scientific Interest (SSSI), which excludes the separately designated Eastern Moors. The SSSI extends over the borders into Greater Manchester and West Yorkshire. A large part of the SSSI is included in the South Pennine Moors Special Area of Conservation. Parts of the SSSI are owned by United Utilities, Yorkshire Water and the National Trust (the holdings of the latter being known as the High Peak Estate).

Principal upland areas within the Dark Peak include Kinder Scout, Bleaklow (both of which rise to over 600 m (2,000 ft)), Black Hill, the Roaches, Shining Tor, Mam Tor, Win Hill and Stanage Edge.

== Biology ==
Plants within the peatlands on Dark Peak SSSI include crowberry, heather and bilberry. Cowberry, cloudberry, cranberry and labrador tea have also been recorded in this protected area. Bog mosses include Sphagnum capillifolium and Sphagnum cuspidatum. In wet flushes, the moss species Sphagnum recurvum and Polytrichum commune occur alongside plants such as marsh violet, bog asphodel, marsh pennywort and round leaved sundew. At seepage lines, plant species include blinks, bog pondweed, water forget-me-not, lesser spearwort, round-leaved crowfoot and lesser skullcap. Beech fern is found on cliff ledges.

The steep-sided cloughs are more forested and have natural broad-leaved woodland. The wooded and semi-wooded areas contain some fragments of the upland oakwood habitat and support gritstone tree specialists including sessile oak, birch, rowan and holly. They also contain various species of mosses, lichens and ferns including hard fern (Blechnum), oak fern (Gymnocarpium), greater fork-moss (Dicranum majus), waved silk-moss (Plagiothecium undulatum), old wood lichen (Lecanactis abietina) and reindeer lichen (Cladonia portentosa). There are also coniferous plantations in some areas, especially around reservoir margins. They support less species, with prominent tree species including the imported japanese larch, sitka spruce, lodgepole pine and the native scots pine. Because of the outbreaks of larch disease and dothistroma needle blight, some of the plantations are gradually being converted to broad-leaved and mixed woodlands.

Insect species in Dark Peak SSSI include the moth species red carpet, northern eggar, northern rustic, golden rod brindle and small autumnal moth. The hover fly Eristalis rupium has been recorded here, as has the golden-ringed dragonfly. Beetle species include Miscodera arctica, Hydnobius spinipes (genus Hydnobius), Leptusa norvegica, Leiodes picea (genus Leiodes), Omalium laticolle (genus Omalium), Bolitochora mulsanti (genus Bolitochora), and Phyllodrepoidea crenata.

Bird species in Dark Peak SSSI include golden plover, dunlin, meadow pipit, curlew, red grouse, short-eared owl and twite.

== Geology ==
Six locations in Dark Peak SSSI have been identified as having special geological significance: Alport Castles, Bleaklow, Blackden Brook, Alport Valley and Featherbed Moss.

== Aircraft crashes ==
Over the years, military aircraft have crashed on the Dark Peak, generally because of a combination of numerous nearby air bases, inexperienced pilots, primitive or faulty equipment and poor visibility. Because of the bleakness and emptiness of the high moorlands and the consequent difficulties of recovery, substantial wreckage remains at some sites in remote parts of the moorland, though militarily sensitive materials were removed and salvage teams sometimes gathered debris into piles, or burned or buried it.
