= Anogdus dissimilis =

Scientific classification
- Domain: Eukaryota
- Kingdom: Animalia
- Phylum: Arthropoda
- Class: Insecta
- Order: Coleoptera
- Suborder: Polyphaga
- Infraorder: Staphyliniformia
- Family: Leiodidae
- Subfamily: Leiodinae
- Tribe: Leiodini
- Genus: Anogdus
- Species: A. dissimilis

Binomial name
- Anogdus dissimilis Blatchley, 1916

Species of beetle

Anogdus dissimilis is a species of round fungus beetles in the family Leiodidae. It is found in North America.
