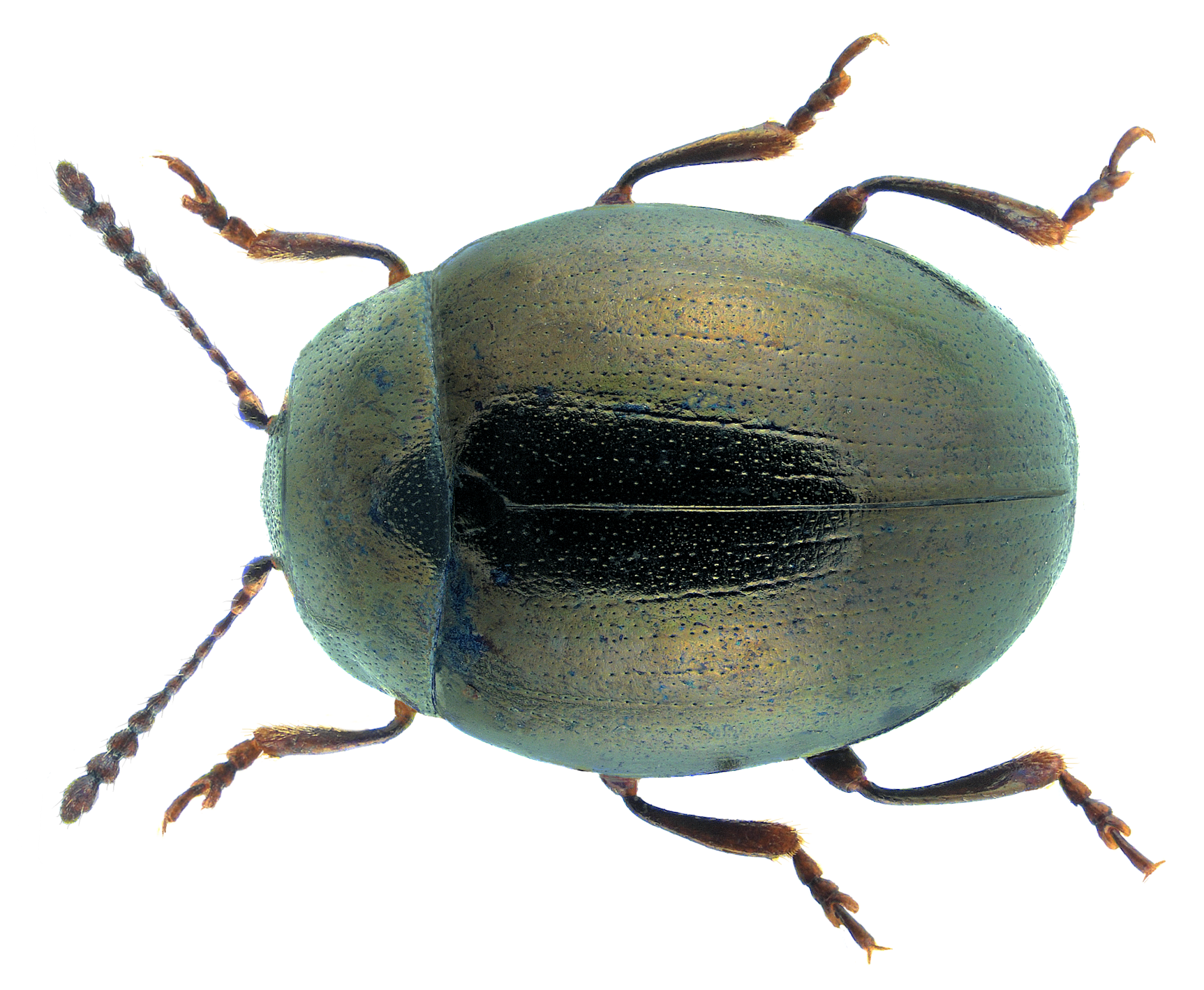

Scientific classification
- Kingdom: Animalia
- Phylum: Arthropoda
- Clade: Pancrustacea
- Class: Insecta
- Order: Coleoptera
- Suborder: Polyphaga
- Infraorder: Cucujiformia
- Family: Chrysomelidae
- Genus: Phaedon
- Species: P. laevigatus

Binomial name
- Phaedon laevigatus (Duftschmid, 1825)

= Phaedon laevigatus =

Species of beetle

Phaedon laevigatus, the watercress leaf beetle, is a species of leaf beetle in the family Chrysomelidae. It is found in Europe and Northern Asia (excluding China) and North America.
