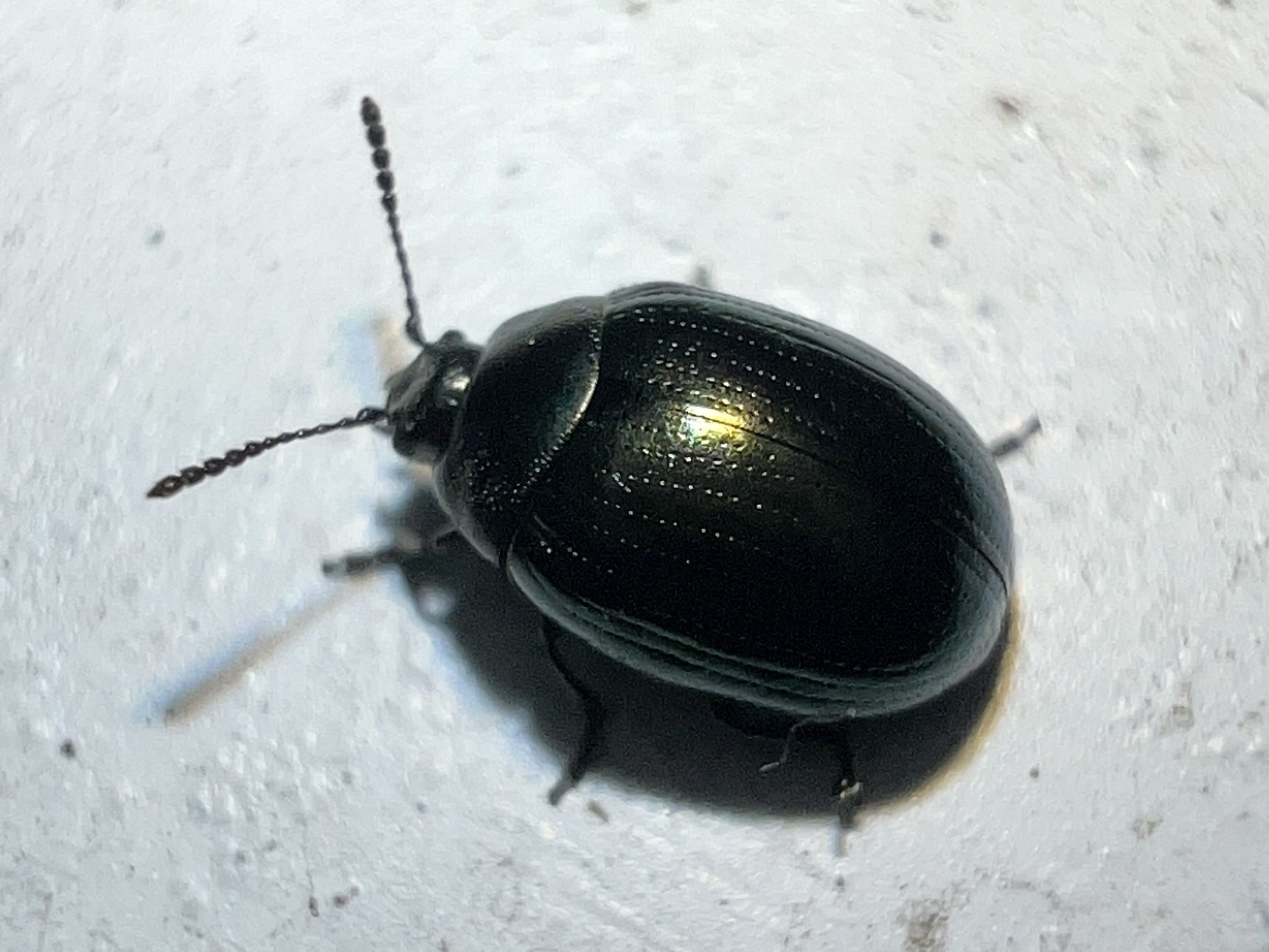

Scientific classification
- Kingdom: Animalia
- Phylum: Arthropoda
- Clade: Pancrustacea
- Class: Insecta
- Order: Coleoptera
- Suborder: Polyphaga
- Infraorder: Cucujiformia
- Family: Chrysomelidae
- Genus: Phaedon
- Species: P. viridis

Binomial name
- Phaedon viridis F. E. Melsheimer, 1847

= Phaedon viridis =

Species of beetle

Phaedon viridis, the watercress leaf beetle, is a species of leaf beetle in the family Chrysomelidae. It is found in North America.
