= Leiodes punctostriata =

Scientific classification
- Domain: Eukaryota
- Kingdom: Animalia
- Phylum: Arthropoda
- Class: Insecta
- Order: Coleoptera
- Suborder: Polyphaga
- Infraorder: Staphyliniformia
- Family: Leiodidae
- Genus: Leiodes
- Species: L. punctostriata

Binomial name
- Leiodes punctostriata Kirby, 1837

Species of beetle

Leiodes punctostriata is a species of round fungus beetle in the family Leiodidae. It is found in North America.
