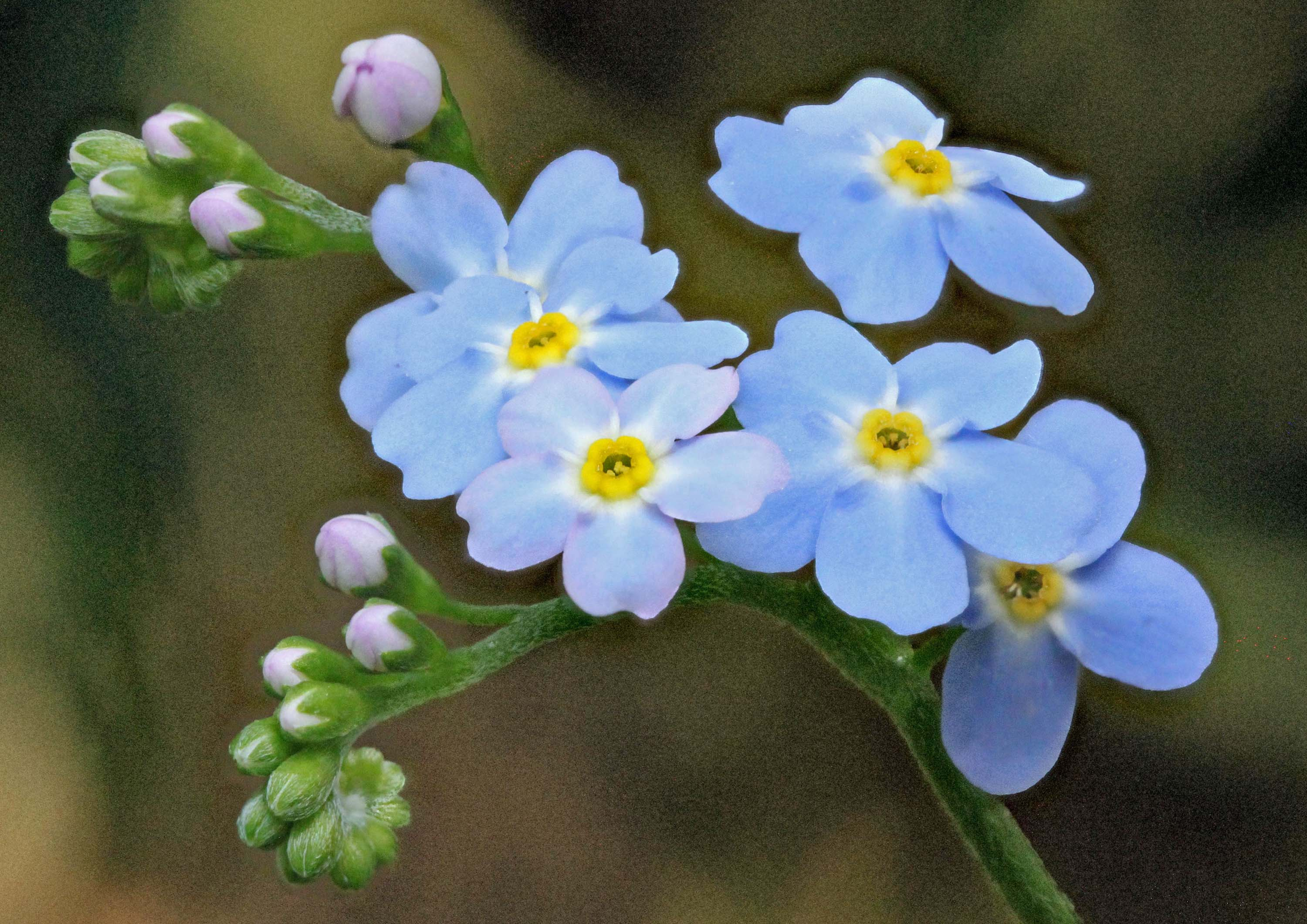

Conservation status
- Least Concern (IUCN 3.1)

Scientific classification
- Kingdom: Plantae
- Clade: Tracheophytes
- Clade: Angiosperms
- Clade: Eudicots
- Clade: Asterids
- Order: Boraginales
- Family: Boraginaceae
- Genus: Myosotis
- Species: M. secunda

Binomial name
- Myosotis secunda Al.Murray

Synonyms
- Synonymy: Myosotis baetica (Pérez Lara) Rocha Afonso; Myosotis repens G.Don; Myosotis repens G.Don ex Hook.

= Myosotis secunda =

Species of flowering plant

Myosotis secunda, also known as the creeping forget-me-not is a species of flowering plant from the family Boraginaceae.

== Description ==
Myosotis secunda is a perennial herb. Creeping stems sprout from the base of the plant and produce roots at nodes. Stems can reach up to 38 cm (15 in) tall. Flowers are usually blue in colour, however white can occasionally be found. Flower spikes possess several flowers which are 4 - 9mm in diameter.

== Distribution ==
This species is endemic to Europe. M. secunda can be found growing in the following countries: United Kingdom, Ireland, Spain, Portugal, France. It can also be found growing on the Isle of Man, Guernsey, Jersey and the Faroe Islands.

In Portugal the species can be found on the mainland, but also on the islands of Madeira and Azores.

== Habitat ==
Myosotis secunda grows in proximity to wetland habitats such as on the margins of streams, rivers, lakes, ponds, creeks and waterfalls. It will also grow in wet grasslands, bogs, fens, marshes, swamps and peatlands. This species often occurs growing in acidic soils.

== Ecology ==
Both M. secunda and M. scorpioides grow in wetland habitats. M. scorpioides grows in nutrient rich soils, while M. secunda will outcompete and replace it in nutrient poor soils.

Myosotis secunda is one of many host plants for the beetle species Phaedon armoraciae.

The species can sometimes be found growing alongside other wetland plant species such as bog pimpernel (Lysimachia tenella, syn. Anagallis tenella) and marsh-bedstraw (Galium palustre).

== Hybridization ==
A new hybrid species was discovered in Bowland Fells, Lancashire, United Kingdom. The hybrid is sterile and between Myosotis secunda and Myosotis stolonifera. It was described by P. Jepson and given the binomial name Myosotis × bollandica.
