= Cyrtusa =

Scientific classification
- Kingdom: Animalia
- Phylum: Arthropoda
- Class: Insecta
- Order: Coleoptera
- Suborder: Polyphaga
- Infraorder: Staphyliniformia
- Family: Leiodidae
- Tribe: Leiodini
- Genus: Cyrtusa; Erichson, 1842

Synonyms
- Caenocyrta Brown, 1937

Genus of beetles

Cyrtusa is a genus of round fungus beetles in the family Leiodidae. There are at least two described species in Cyrtusa.

== Species ==
These two species belong to the genus Cyrtusa:

- Cyrtusa grossepunctata Daffner, 1988
- Cyrtusa subtestacea (Gyllenhal, 1813)
