= Leptusa norvegica =

Scientific classification
- Domain: Eukaryota
- Kingdom: Animalia
- Phylum: Arthropoda
- Class: Insecta
- Order: Coleoptera
- Suborder: Polyphaga
- Infraorder: Staphyliniformia
- Family: Staphylinidae
- Genus: Leptusa
- Species: L. norvegica

Binomial name
- Leptusa norvegica Strand, 1941

Species of beetle

Leptusa norvegica is a species of beetle belonging to the family Staphylinidae.

It is native to Northern Europe.
