= Anogdus =

Scientific classification
- Kingdom: Animalia
- Phylum: Arthropoda
- Clade: Pancrustacea
- Class: Insecta
- Order: Coleoptera
- Suborder: Polyphaga
- Infraorder: Staphyliniformia
- Family: Leiodidae
- Subfamily: Leiodinae
- Tribe: Leiodini
- Genus: Anogdus; LeConte, J. L., 1866

Synonyms
- Neocyrtusa Brown, W. J., 1937

Genus of beetles

Anogdus is a genus of round fungus beetles in the family Leiodidae. There are about 17 described species in Anogdus, found in the Americas.

== Species ==
These 17 species belong to the genus Anogdus:

- Anogdus alachua Peck & Cook, 2013
- Anogdus capitatus LeConte, J. L., 1866
- Anogdus championi Peck & Cook, 2019
- Anogdus cochise Peck & Cook, 2013
- Anogdus dissimilis Blatchley, 1916
- Anogdus fusciclavus (Fall, 1925)
- Anogdus huachuca Peck & Cook, 2013
- Anogdus insolitus (Brown, W. J., 1937)
- Anogdus obsoletus (Melsheimer, F. E., 1844)
- Anogdus potens (Brown, W. J., 1932)
- Anogdus puritanus (Fall, 1925)
- Anogdus rileyi Peck & Cook, 2013
- Anogdus sculpturatus (Fall, 1910)
- Anogdus secretus (Brown, W. J., 1937)
- Anogdus superans (Fall, 1910)
- Anogdus texanus Peck & Cook, 2013
- Anogdus tridens Peck & Cook, 2013
