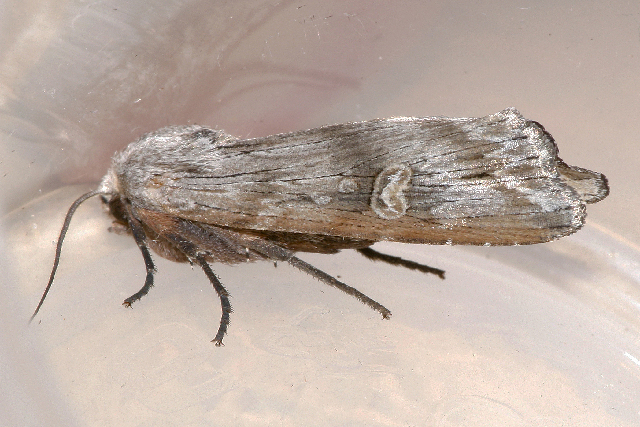
- Lithomoia germana

Scientific classification
- Kingdom: Animalia
- Phylum: Arthropoda
- Clade: Pancrustacea
- Class: Insecta
- Order: Lepidoptera
- Superfamily: Noctuoidea
- Family: Noctuidae
- Subfamily: Cuculliinae
- Genus: Lithomoia; Hübner, 1821

= Lithomoia =

Genus of moths

Lithomoia is a genus of moths of the family Noctuidae.

== Species ==
- Lithomoia germana (Morrison, 1874)
- Lithomoia solidaginis (Hübner, [1803])
