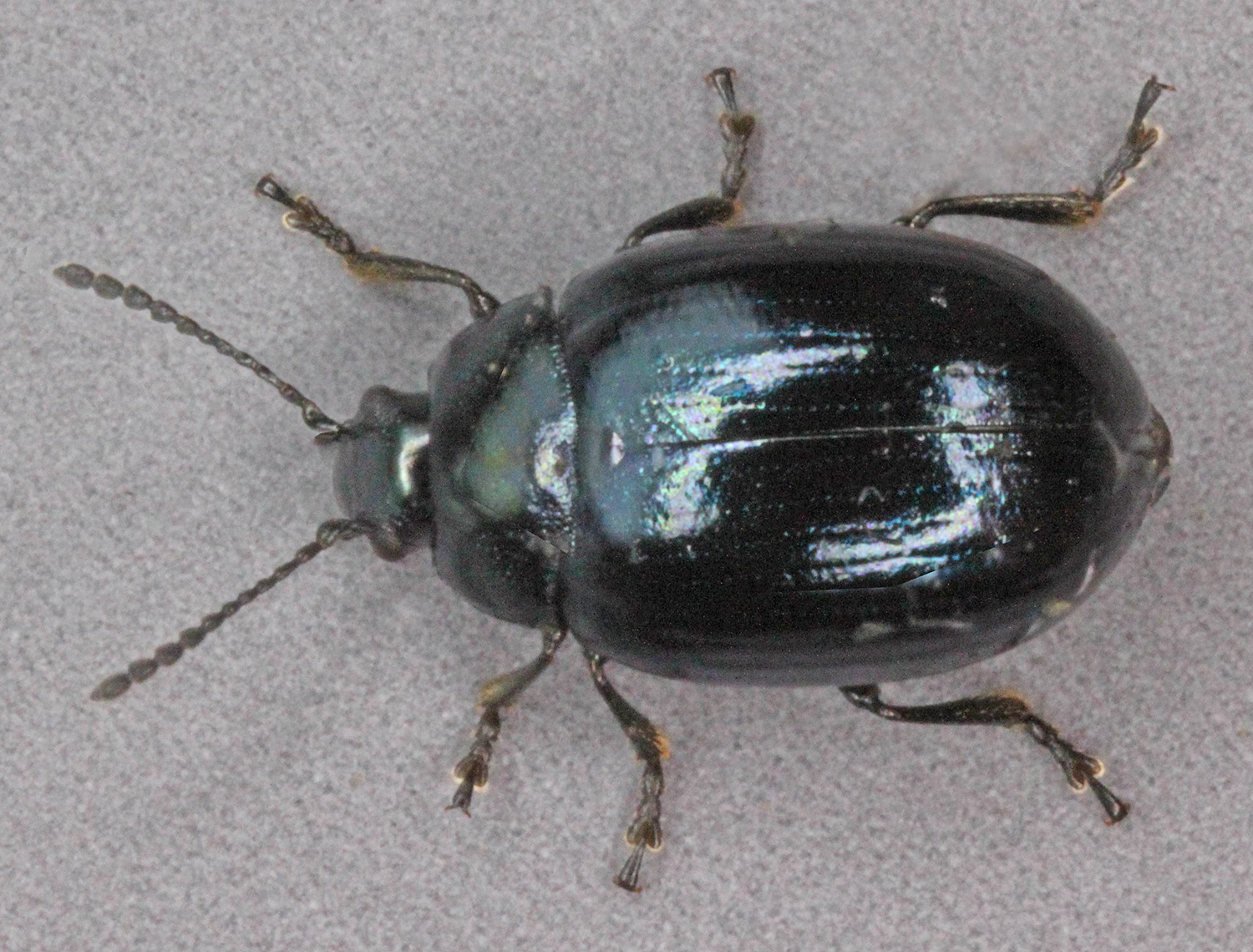

Scientific classification
- Kingdom: Animalia
- Phylum: Arthropoda
- Clade: Pancrustacea
- Class: Insecta
- Order: Coleoptera
- Suborder: Polyphaga
- Infraorder: Cucujiformia
- Family: Chrysomelidae
- Genus: Phaedon
- Species: P. cochleariae

Binomial name
- Phaedon cochleariae (Fabricius, 1792)

= Phaedon cochleariae =

Species of beetle

Phaedon cochleariae (commonly called mustard beetle or watercress beetle) is a non-social, holometabolous species of leaf beetle native to Europe.

They experience distinct personalities that are influenced by population density, sex, inbreeding, and diet. This is exhibited by varying levels of aggression and sexual activity. As non-social creatures, P. cochleariae thrive in lower population densities, where they benefit from reduced competition and abundant resources which improve their individual fitness. They are at a potential risk of extinction because of high levels of inbreeding depression in the wild.

The mustard leaf beetle is a common pest of horseradish and cabbage plants. Their diet of external leaves makes them overtly visible to predators. Due to their high visibility, they have evolved to secrete defensive and volatile substances, called iridoids, to deter predators. These secretions also contain antimicrobial and antifungal properties.

== Etymology ==
Phaedon cochleariae is colloquially referred to as the mustard leaf beetle and sometimes the watercress beetle because this particular species of leaf beetle is commonly found feeding on the leaves of mustard and watercress plants among other types of Brassicas.

== Distribution ==
Mustard leaf beetles are native to Europe. They can be found in abundance in the United Kingdom, Ireland, the Netherlands, Sweden, France, Germany, and Belgium. They were introduced to North America.

== Description ==
Adult body sizes range from 3–4 mm in length, and they are ovular in shape. Their elytra are a reflective dark blue-green color and are abundantly dotted with dorsal glands in a parallel lined pattern. Their antennae are black in color. This species of leaf beetle has not been thoroughly studied for any notable sexually dimorphic traits.

== Diet ==
The diet of P. cochleariae mainly consists of an assortment of different Brassicas, including mustard and watercress. With further analysis and research, it was found that the beetles prefer Brassica as their host plant because of the polar methanol compounds that the plant contains. Through fractionating the methanol extract from Sinapis Alba (Brassica) and examining the response of mustard leaf beetles to different fractions of the extract, it was concluded that a combination of glucosinolates and flavonoids encouraged the highest level of consumption from the mustard leaf beetle. Glucosinolates and flavonoids when consumed separately did not invoke as high consumption as they did in combination. In a study that compared plant preference for Mustard leaf beetles, adult P. cochleariae gravitated towards feeding on cabbage crops more than their natural host plant, watercress. This is because cabbage plants are more abundant in glucosinolates compared to watercress, and are therefore more nutritious for adult P. cochleariae.

== Life history ==
=== Life cycle ===
Phaedon cochleariae is a holometabolous beetle, meaning that they go through a complete metamorphic cycle. They begin as eggs, then hatch into larvae (undergoing three separate larval stages). Soon after that, they undergo the pupae stage. Finally, they achieve a state of full maturity in the adult stage.

== Physiology ==
=== Visual and olfactory cues ===
Research has revealed that certain olfactory and visual cues are paramount in the mustard beetle's ability to locate host plants. From a visual perspective, it was found that beetles naturally orient towards vertically or horizontally striped patterns and that they can accurately discriminate between green and yellow leaves. This is an important discrimination for mustard beetles to make since it helps them differentiate between young (green leaves) and mature (yellow leaves) leaves when it comes to feeding behaviors. They also tested olfactory sensation in mustard beetles using the plant N. officinale, which contains a highly volatile compound known as 2-phenylethyl isothiocyanate. Both males and females responded to this compound in an aversive manner. Researchers concluded that males orientate more consistently to color cues (visual) while females do not show a preference between visual and olfactory cues. This perhaps shows that visual cues override olfactory cues in male mustard beetles, a sex-based dissimilarity for which the consequences require further investigation.

=== Metabolism ===
Researchers have conducted new experimentation into the metabolism of mustard beetles, and more specifically, how they cope with defense mechanisms propagated by Brassicaceae plants. Brassicales have been shown to have a binary defense system in which glucosinolates and myrosinases form a toxic hydrolysis compound that predators find aversive. To combat these toxic defense mechanisms, mustard beetle larvae have adapted to metabolize glucosinolate breakdown products from the aromatic acid form to conjugates of aspartic acid. Interestingly, forming aspartic acid conjugates as a way of metabolizing glucosinolate is different from what other Brassicaceae herbivores have been shown to exercise. Thus, researchers confirmed their initial hypothesis that mustard beetles evolved a novel mechanism to ingest glucosinolates.

=== Defensive strategies ===
P. cochleariae, as well as other species of leaf beetle, produce iridoids throughout all stages of their life cycle to defend themselves from predators that may threaten their survival. This is especially true for the highly sensitive larval stages where they are more susceptible to predators and death. When faced with a predator, they secrete the defensive iridoids out of their dorsal glands (appearing in the form of droplets) to deter the threat and ensure a higher rate of survival. A study suggested that they developed this particular mode of defense because of their specific diet of external leaves, which makes them particularly more visible to predators. The mustard leaf beetle likely evolved to make up for their overt visibility by producing these deterrent iridoid compounds. The defensive secretions produced by the mustard leaf beetle demonstrate antimicrobial and antifungal properties, likely due to the volatile iridoids that make up the secretions.

== Behavior ==
=== A non-social species ===
Phaedon cochleariae is a non-social species, which makes it highly sensitive to population density. Mustard leaf beetles are benefited by and thrive in lower population densities, this has been found to play a crucial role in their development and fitness. Shorter development time for isolated larvae was observed, which proves to be beneficial due to the shorter time spent in the critical and vulnerable larval stage, ensuring higher fitness and likelihood for survival. On the contrary, it was observed that larvae brought up in groups had a longer larval phase likely due to the chemicals secreted by surrounding larvae. Group individuals experienced higher rivalry and competition for limited resources which likely played a role in the time spent in larval phase. The population density during larval stage indicated significant effects to reproductive success of the beetle, with lower population density allowing females of the species to lay more eggs. Reproductive success can still be influenced by adult environmental conditions like resource availability, but generally a female will lay a larger amount of eggs if raised in low population density because of favorable early environmental conditions increasing their overall fitness, including their future reproductive success.

=== Personality ===
The dimensions of P. cochleariae personality is defined by a combination of boldness, activity, and exploration. Personality is conveyed within 5 to 14 days within adulthood and appears to remain relatively constant and stable throughout the adult lifetime of Phaedon Cochleariae. Larvae tend to be generally less active and bolder than adults, but personality can be inconsistent in stages before adulthood. Individuals isolated at low population densities during larval and adult stages experienced differences in personality from grouped individuals. Isolated individuals were bolder, which can be attributed to their limited social experience and ignorance of the risks of displaying aggressive behavior in a group context where they might receive repercussions from the group. Another possible reasoning to their higher relative boldness can be attributed to the plentiful availability of resources and lack of competition. Further research shows that grouped beetles seemed to be more active than isolated individuals. Their heightened activity level can be attributed to experiencing more mating opportunities due to the higher population density. The more they copulate, the higher their reproductive success is likely to be, thereby increasing the proliferation of their genes and their own individual fitness. On the other hand, isolated individuals are reared in low population densities and do not experience a heightened need for activity as a result. Isolated beetles have fewer potential mates to copulate with, which reflects a lower activity level relative to group individuals. The diet of P. cochleariae seems to also influence the dimensions of their personality, with adult beetles fed on cabbage crops being bolder and more active than the ones fed on their natural host plant. Out of all parameters for beetle personality, exploration is the least malleable and most stable trait across differing population densities. It seems that environmental conditions are less likely to influence exploration.

== Mating ==
Individuals of P. cochleariae experience diet-assortative mating which intercepts possible sexual interference with sympatric beetle populations. Cuticular Hydrocarbons (CHCs), which can act as sex pheromones, are used not only for sex differentiation by beetles of the same species, but also to differentiate conspecific mates from similar species that share the same habitat as them. CHC phenotype is established and changes in accordance to environmental factors such as diet. This can be used by the mustard leaf beetle to prevent sexual interference with sympatric species that feed on different host plants as their mating recognition system diverges with the difference in diet and does not register other phenotypes as potential mates. CHC phenotype matching within the species is also used to evaluate the most suitable mate, with male mustard leaf beetles preferring and copulating longer with conspecific female mates that fed on the same host plant as them.

Although CHC composition in females and males of the mustard leaf beetle species are identical, the concentration of the compound differs between the sexes. The difference in concentration can be utilized by mustard leaf beetles to differentiate between females and males of the species. However, the ability to differentiate the sexes through CHC concentration does not prevent the male of P. cochleariae to mate with other males. In fact, they copulate with other conspecific males just as much as conspecific females. It is observed that copulation time is longer when males copulate with females instead of other males. A study suggests that the shorter copulation duration with males can be attributed to the physical stimuli indicating that the individual they are mating with is male rather than the CHC sex phenotype. This likely means that the beetles rarely use CHC concentration to differentiate the sex of a potential mate, rather they use tactile bodily cues.

=== Inbreeding ===
Family members of P. cochleariae possess recognizable CHC profiles that can be used to differentiate family from other conspecific individuals. However, the mustard leaf beetle does not seem to utilize the profiles when searching for a mate. This often means that in a low density environment, it is highly likely that P. cochleariae will unknowingly mate with members of family. This is increasingly evident as habitats fragment due to global warming and climate change, and risks the development of inbreeding depression. Inbreeding depression can be extremely detrimental to the fitness of P. cochleariae: it compromises the reproductive success of female mustard leaf beetles, increases mortality rates of larvae and young adults, decreases the rate of larval hatching, and can lead to extinction. Mustard leaf beetle personality can be influenced by inbreeding, with inbred individuals showing traits of higher boldness due to their reduced fitness. Inbred individuals are less likely to defend themselves against predators during an attack compared to outbred individuals, which can be attributed to the inbred individuals' compromised fitness. These conclusions suggest that changes in fitness due to inbreeding can also influence the personality of P. cochleariae.
