= Standfussiana sturanyi =

Scientific classification
- Domain: Eukaryota
- Kingdom: Animalia
- Phylum: Arthropoda
- Class: Insecta
- Order: Lepidoptera
- Superfamily: Noctuoidea
- Family: Noctuidae
- Genus: Standfussiana
- Species: S. sturanyi

Binomial name
- Standfussiana sturanyi (Rebel, 1906)

Synonyms
- Agrotis sturanyi

Species of moth

Standfussiana sturanyi is a species of owlet moth in the genus Standfussiana. It was described by Hans Rebel in 1906 as Agrotis sturanyi.
