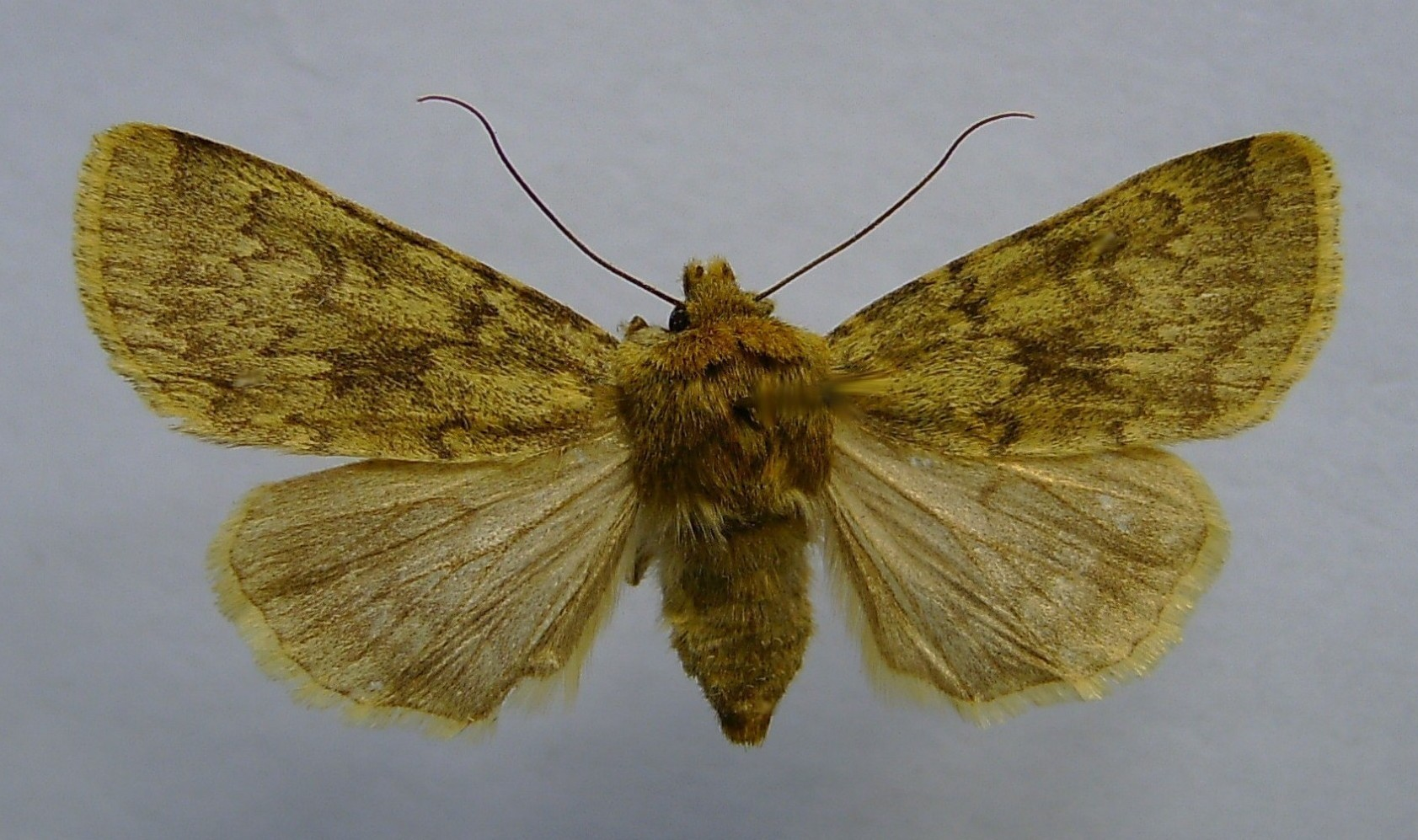
- Standfussiana wiskotti

Scientific classification
- Domain: Eukaryota
- Kingdom: Animalia
- Phylum: Arthropoda
- Class: Insecta
- Order: Lepidoptera
- Superfamily: Noctuoidea
- Family: Noctuidae
- Subfamily: Noctuinae
- Genus: Standfussiana; Boursin, 1946

= Standfussiana =

Genus of moths

Standfussiana is a genus of moths of the family Noctuidae.

== Species ==
- Standfussiana dalmata (Staudinger, 1901)
- Standfussiana defessa (Lederer, 1858)
- Standfussiana insulicola (Turati, 1919)
- Standfussiana lucernea (Linnaeus, 1758)
- Standfussiana nictymera (Boisduval, [1837])
- Standfussiana sturanyi (Rebel, 1906)
- Standfussiana wiskotti (Standfuss, 1888)
