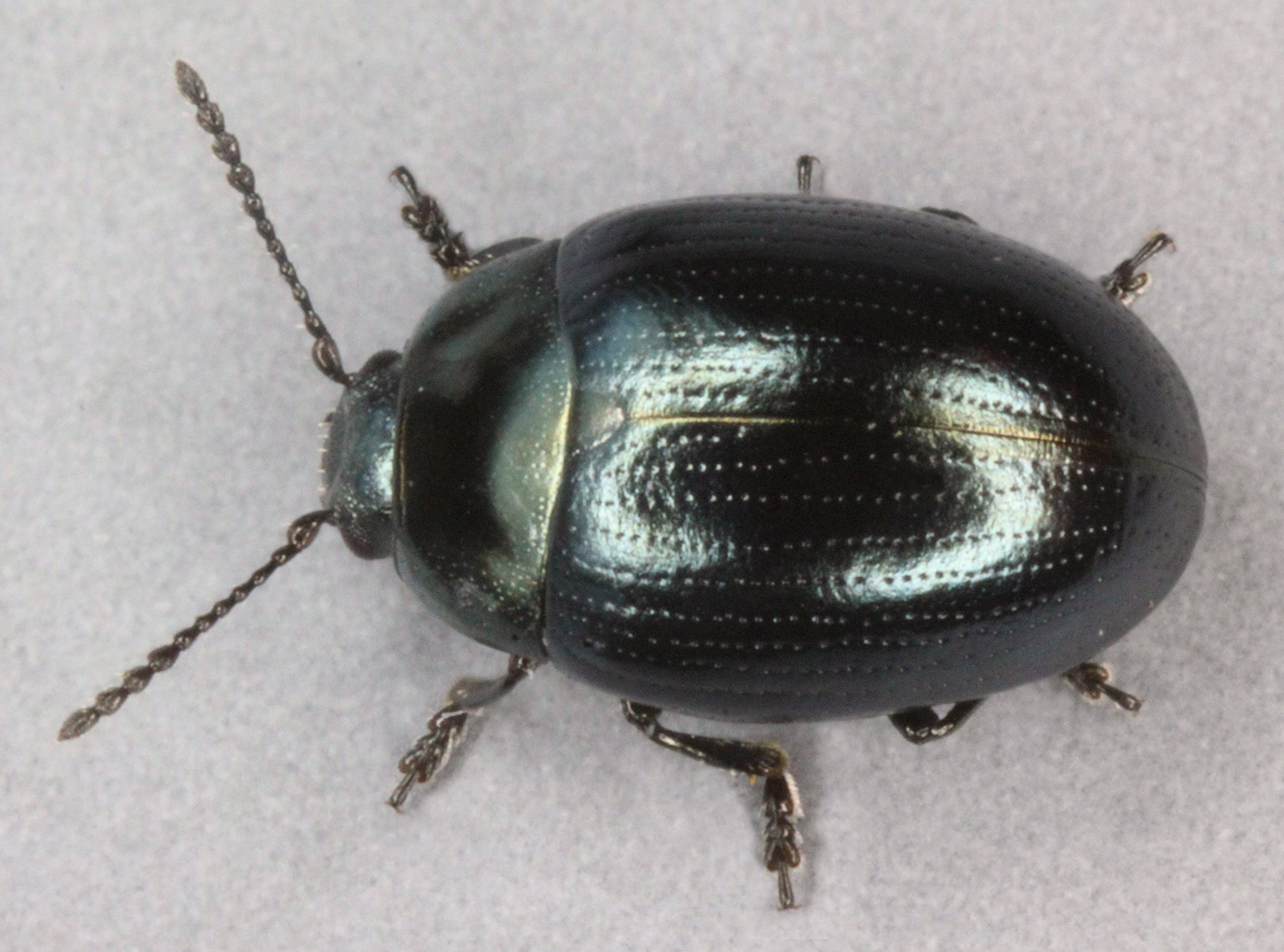

Scientific classification
- Kingdom: Animalia
- Phylum: Arthropoda
- Clade: Pancrustacea
- Class: Insecta
- Order: Coleoptera
- Suborder: Polyphaga
- Infraorder: Cucujiformia
- Family: Chrysomelidae
- Genus: Phaedon
- Species: P. tumidulus

Binomial name
- Phaedon tumidulus (Germar, 1824)

Synonyms
- Chrysomela tumidula

= Phaedon tumidulus =

Species of beetle

Phaedon tumidulus, also known as the celery leaf beetle, is a species of leaf beetle in the genus Phaedon. It is associated with umbellifers.

== Description ==
Phaedon tumidulus adult beetles measure 3.5–4.01 mm in length. They are usually dark green or brassy in colour, but are occasionally blueish.
