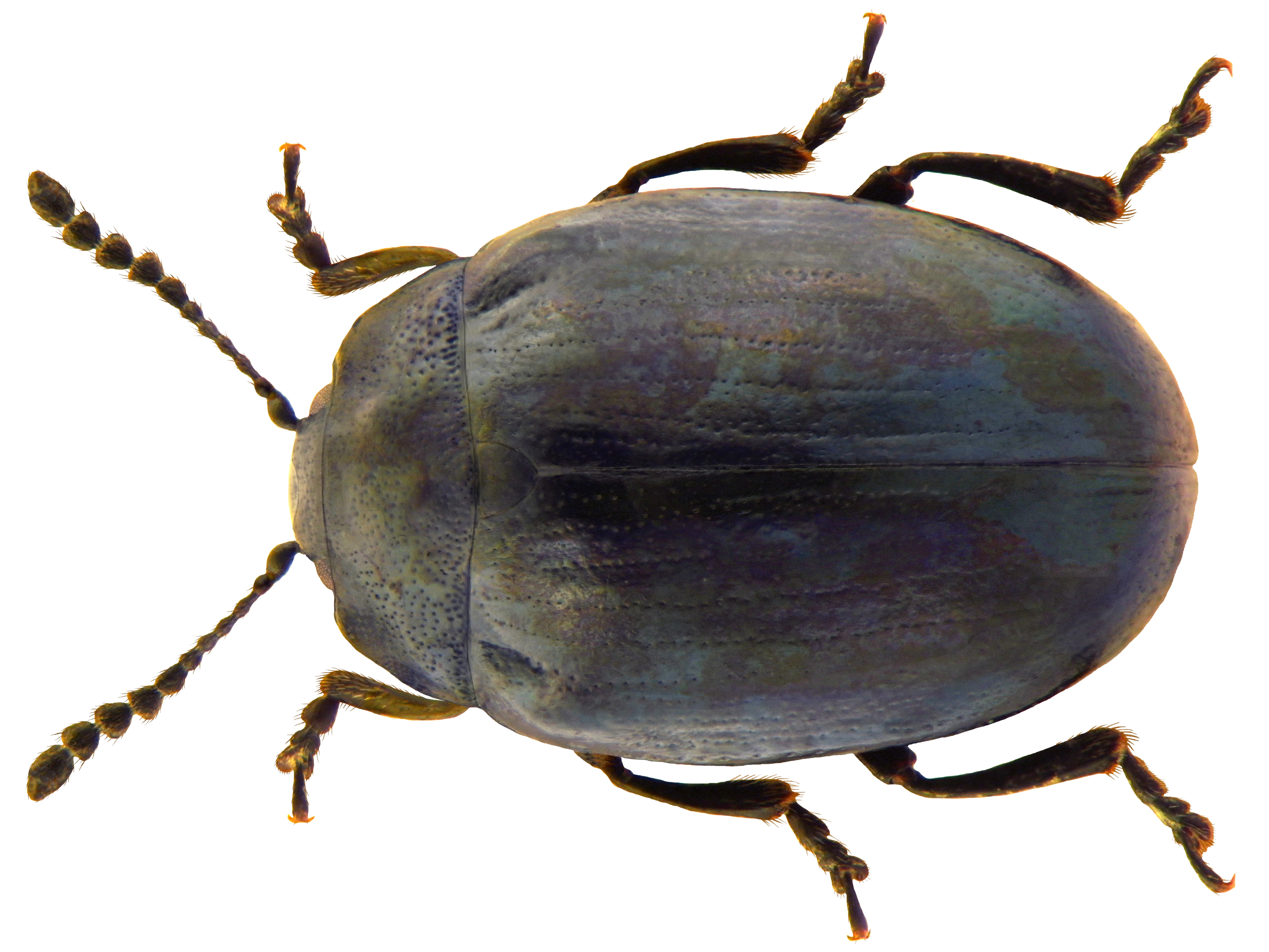
- Phaedon armoraciae (Linnaeus, 1758)

Scientific classification
- Kingdom: Animalia
- Phylum: Arthropoda
- Clade: Pancrustacea
- Class: Insecta
- Order: Coleoptera
- Suborder: Polyphaga
- Infraorder: Cucujiformia
- Family: Chrysomelidae
- Subfamily: Chrysomelinae
- Tribe: Chrysomelini
- Genus: Phaedon; Latreille, 1829

= Phaedon (beetle) =

Genus of beetles

Phaedon is a genus of Chrysomelinae (a subfamily of leaf beetles).

== Selected species ==
- Phaedon armoraciae (Linnaeus, 1758)^{i c g b}
- Phaedon brassicae Baly, 1874^{g}
- Phaedon cochleariae (Fabricius, 1792)^{g}
- Phaedon concinnus (Stephens, 1831)^{g}
- Phaedon cyanescens Stål, 1860^{i c g b}
- Phaedon desotonis Balsbaugh, 1983^{i c g b} (desoto leaf beetle)
- Phaedon fulvescens Weise^{g}
- Phaedon laevigatus (Duftschmid, 1825)^{i c g b} (watercress leaf beetle)
- Phaedon menthae Wollaston, 1864^{g}
- Phaedon oviformis (J. L. LeConte, 1861)^{i c g b}
- Phaedon prasinellus (J. L. LeConte, 1861)^{i c g b}
- Phaedon purpureus (Linell, 1898)^{i c g b}
- Phaedon salicinus (Herr, 1845)^{g}
- Phaedon tumidulus (Germar, 1824)^{g}
- Phaedon viridis F. E. Melsheimer, 1847^{i c g b} (watercress leaf beetle)

Data sources: i = ITIS, c = Catalogue of Life, g = GBIF, b = Bugguide.net

== Gallery ==
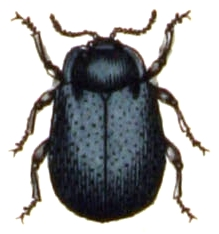
Phaedon armoraciae

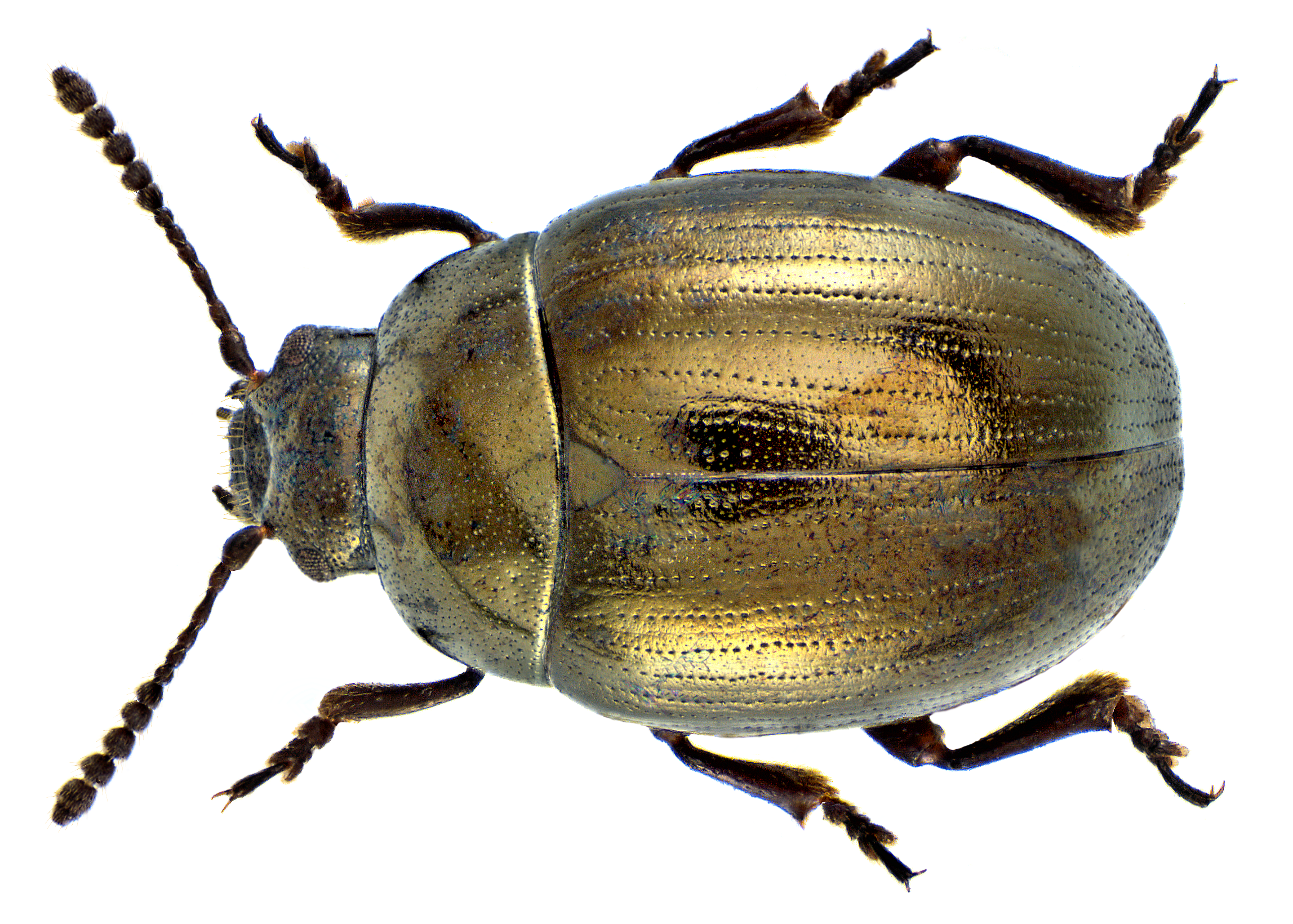
Phaedon pyritosus (Rossi, 1792)

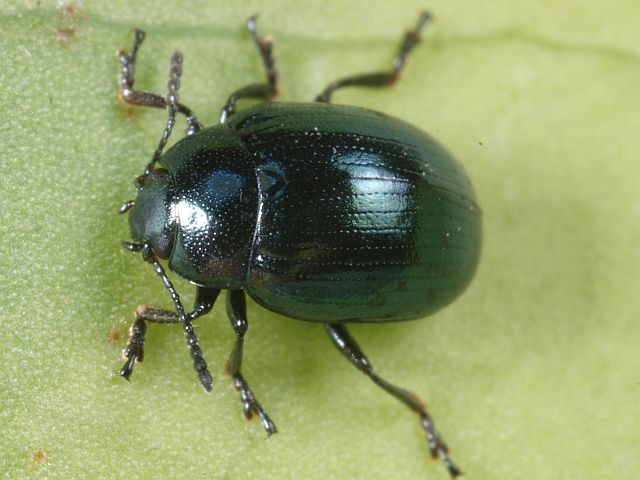
Phaedon cochleariae
