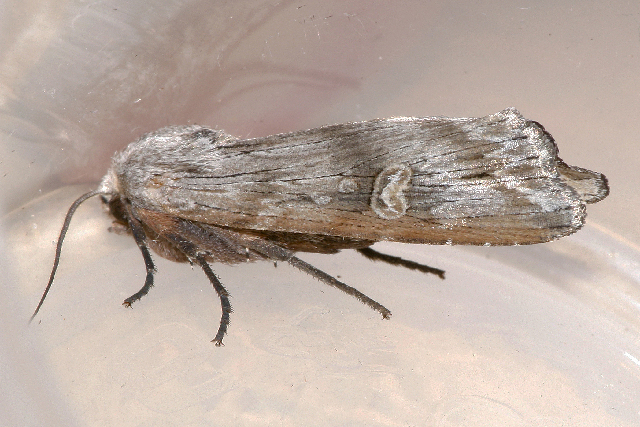

Scientific classification
- Domain: Eukaryota
- Kingdom: Animalia
- Phylum: Arthropoda
- Class: Insecta
- Order: Lepidoptera
- Superfamily: Noctuoidea
- Family: Noctuidae
- Genus: Lithomoia
- Species: L. germana

Binomial name
- Lithomoia germana (Morrison, 1874)

Synonyms
- Calocampa germana Morrison, 1874

= Lithomoia germana =

Species of moth

Lithomoia germana, the American brindle, is a moth of the family Noctuidae. It is found from Alaska to Newfoundland south to Pennsylvania, Colorado and Oregon.

The wingspan is about 40 mm. Adults are on wing from mid-April to early May and again from mid-August to the beginning of October.

The larvae feed on various trees and woody shrubs of the families Salicaceae and Betulaceae. Adults feed on nectar of goldenrod flowers.

It hibernates as an adult.

== Subspecies ==
- Lithomoia germana germana
- Lithomoia germana morrisoni Barnes & Benjamin, 1922 (Alaska)
- Lithomoia germana albertae McDunnough, 1938 (Alberta)
