= Standfussiana defessa =

Scientific classification
- Kingdom: Animalia
- Phylum: Arthropoda
- Class: Insecta
- Order: Lepidoptera
- Superfamily: Noctuoidea
- Family: Noctuidae
- Genus: Standfussiana
- Species: S. defessa

Binomial name
- Standfussiana defessa (Lederer, 1858)

Synonyms
- Agrotis defessa Lederer, 1858

Species of moth

Standfussiana defessa is a moth of the family Noctuidae. It is found on high altitudes in Lebanon, Syria and Israel.

Adults are on wing from May to August. There is one generation per year.
