= Leptusa pusio =

Scientific classification
- Kingdom: Animalia
- Phylum: Arthropoda
- Class: Insecta
- Order: Coleoptera
- Suborder: Polyphaga
- Infraorder: Staphyliniformia
- Family: Staphylinidae
- Genus: Leptusa
- Species: L. pusio

Binomial name
- Leptusa pusio (Casey, 1906)

Species of beetle

Leptusa pusio is a species of rove beetle in the family Staphylinidae. It is found in North America.
