= Phaedon oviformis =

Scientific classification
- Kingdom: Animalia
- Phylum: Arthropoda
- Clade: Pancrustacea
- Class: Insecta
- Order: Coleoptera
- Suborder: Polyphaga
- Infraorder: Cucujiformia
- Family: Chrysomelidae
- Genus: Phaedon
- Species: P. oviformis

Binomial name
- Phaedon oviformis (J. L. LeConte, 1861)

Species of beetle

Phaedon oviformis is a species of leaf beetle in the family Chrysomelidae. It is found in North America.
