= Leiodes ciliaris =

Scientific classification
- Domain: Eukaryota
- Kingdom: Animalia
- Phylum: Arthropoda
- Class: Insecta
- Order: Coleoptera
- Suborder: Polyphaga
- Infraorder: Staphyliniformia
- Family: Leiodidae
- Genus: Leiodes
- Species: L. ciliaris

Binomial name
- Leiodes ciliaris (Schmidt, 1841)

Species of beetle

Leiodes ciliaris is a species of fungus beetle in the Leiodidae family.
