= Leiodes puncticollis =

Scientific classification
- Domain: Eukaryota
- Kingdom: Animalia
- Phylum: Arthropoda
- Class: Insecta
- Order: Coleoptera
- Suborder: Polyphaga
- Infraorder: Staphyliniformia
- Family: Leiodidae
- Genus: Leiodes
- Species: L. puncticollis

Binomial name
- Leiodes puncticollis (Thomson, 1862)

Synonyms
- Leiodes bradorata Brown, 1932

Species of beetle

Leiodes puncticollis is a species of round fungus beetle in the family Leiodidae. It is found in Europe and Northern Asia (excluding China) and North America.
