= Leiodes assimilis =

Scientific classification
- Domain: Eukaryota
- Kingdom: Animalia
- Phylum: Arthropoda
- Class: Insecta
- Order: Coleoptera
- Suborder: Polyphaga
- Infraorder: Staphyliniformia
- Family: Leiodidae
- Genus: Leiodes
- Species: L. assimilis

Binomial name
- Leiodes assimilis (LeConte, 1850)

Species of beetle

Leiodes assimilis is a species of round fungus beetle in the family Leiodidae. It is found in North America.
