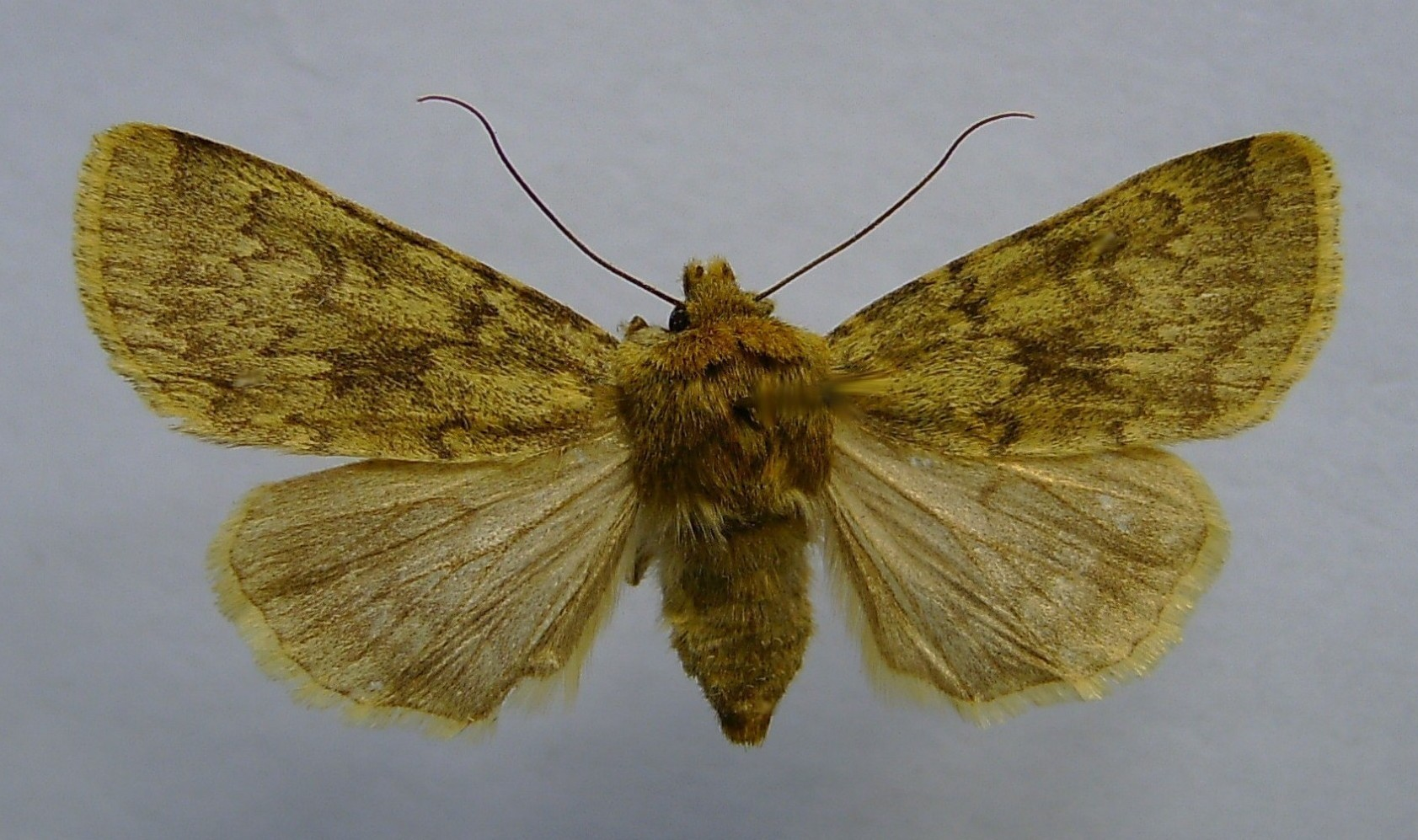

Scientific classification
- Kingdom: Animalia
- Phylum: Arthropoda
- Class: Insecta
- Order: Lepidoptera
- Superfamily: Noctuoidea
- Family: Noctuidae
- Genus: Standfussiana
- Species: S. wiskotti

Binomial name
- Standfussiana wiskotti Standfuss, 1888

Synonyms
- Agrotis wiskotti; Agrotis flavidior

= Standfussiana wiskotti =

Species of moth

Standfussiana wiskotti is a moth of the family Noctuidae. It is only found above the tree-line in the Alps in Switzerland, France, Italy and Austria. It is found to heights of up to 3,500 meters.

The wingspan is 35–44 mm. The moth flies from July to August depending on the location.

The larvae feed on various herbaceous plants.
