= Phaedon concinnus =

Scientific classification
- Kingdom: Animalia
- Phylum: Arthropoda
- Clade: Pancrustacea
- Class: Insecta
- Order: Coleoptera
- Suborder: Polyphaga
- Infraorder: Cucujiformia
- Family: Chrysomelidae
- Genus: Phaedon
- Species: P. concinnus

Binomial name
- Phaedon concinnus Stephens, 1831

Synonyms
- Phaedon armoraciae var. concinnus

Species of beetle

Phaedon concinnus is a species of leaf beetle in the genus Phaedon. It is associated with Plantago maritima and Triglochin maritimum

== Description ==
Phaedon concinnus adult beetles measure 3.2–4.1 mm in length. They are bright metallic green to greenish-blue in colour, occasionally coppery.
