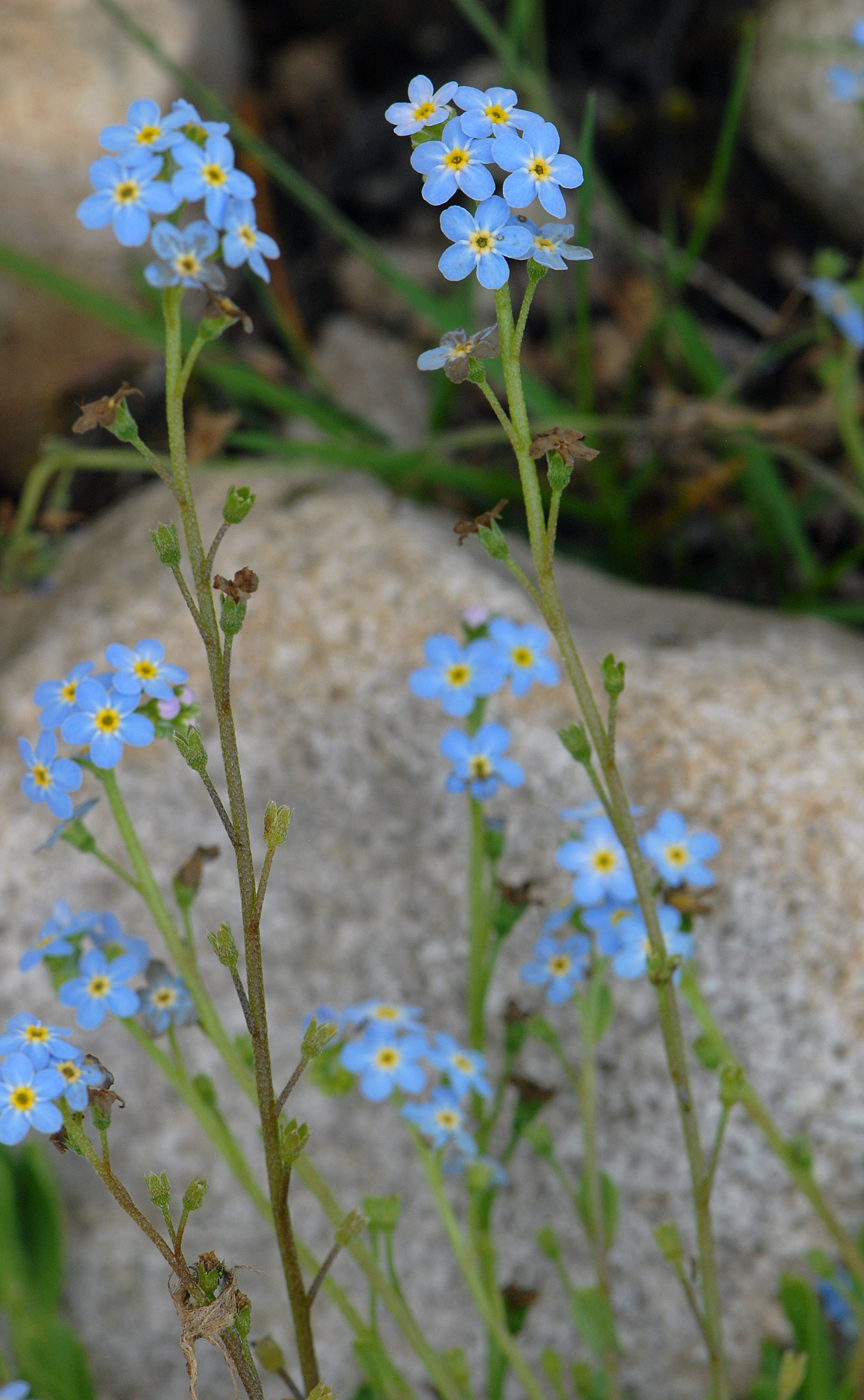

Scientific classification
- Kingdom: Plantae
- Clade: Tracheophytes
- Clade: Angiosperms
- Clade: Eudicots
- Clade: Asterids
- Order: Boraginales
- Family: Boraginaceae
- Genus: Myosotis
- Species: M. × bollandica

Binomial name
- Myosotis × bollandica P. Jepson, 2012
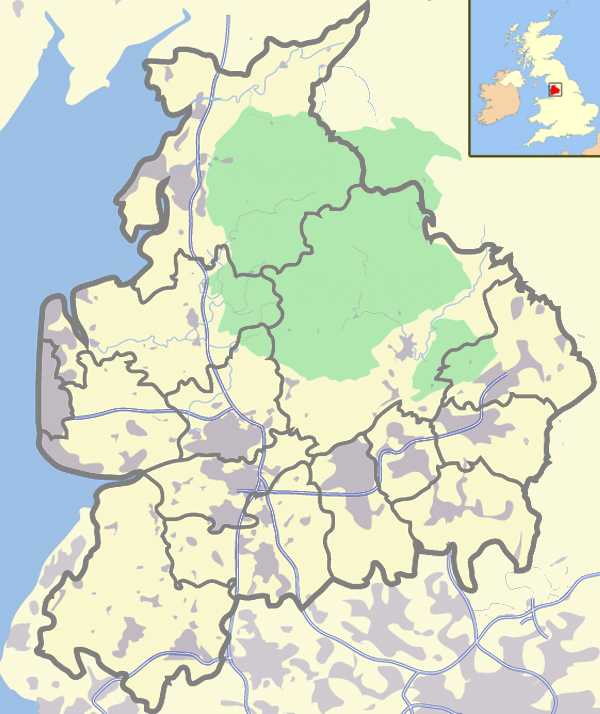
- The Forest of Bowland AONB shown (in green) with the district boundaries of Lancashire within the United Kingdom.

= Myosotis × bollandica =

Hybrid species of flowering plant

Myosotis × bollandica, also known as the Bowland forget-me-not, is a hybrid species of flowering plant within the genus Myosotis and family Boraginaceae. The hybrid displays an overall appearance intermediate between the parent species M. secunda and M. stolonifera. The hybrid was first discovered in the Bowland Fells of Lancashire, UK.

== Description ==
Myosotis × bollandica is a perennial and sterile hybrid, therefore can only reproduce via vegetative reproduction. It features erect stems that can reach heights ranging from 15–50 cm (5.9–19.7 in) tall. At the base, the stems are often decumbent, while the lower half of the stem is stoloniferous, with prominent stolons originating from the basal nodes. The stem hairs display variation, primarily being patent to erecto-patent below and adpressed in the inflorescence.

=== Leaves ===
The species is characterized by sparsely hairy leaves that are typically oblong to ovate in shape. Leaves can grow up to 3 cm (1.2 in) in length, although they are rarely longer. They are about 2-4 times longer than they are broad and often have a spathulate shape. The apex of the leaves is usually obtuse to shallowly emarginate, and they may exhibit a blue-green hue, particularly when young.

=== Flowers ===
Myosotis × bollandica produces pale blue petals. The petals typically measure 3–6 mm across and are noticeably brighter in colour compared to those of M. stolonifera. Fruiting pedicels (the stalks that support the flowers) are mostly 2-3 times as long as the calyx. However, the lower pedicels can be longer, reaching up to 4-5 times the length of the maturing cyme. The calyces, measuring about 2–3 mm, are covered in adpressed hairs. The lobes of the calyx are oblong-acute to subobtuse, exhibiting an intermediate shape between the triangular, acute lobes of M. secunda and the oblong, rounded to obtuse lobes of M. stolonifera. The styles of the flower are relatively short, about three-fifths the length of the calyx or slightly longer than the calyx tube. Additionally, the cymes of the plant mature with noticeably small and narrow calyces due to the failure of nutlets to form. Due to being sterile the fruiting bodies never produce viable seed. The chromosome count of Myosotis × bollandica is 2n=36.

== Distribution and habitat ==
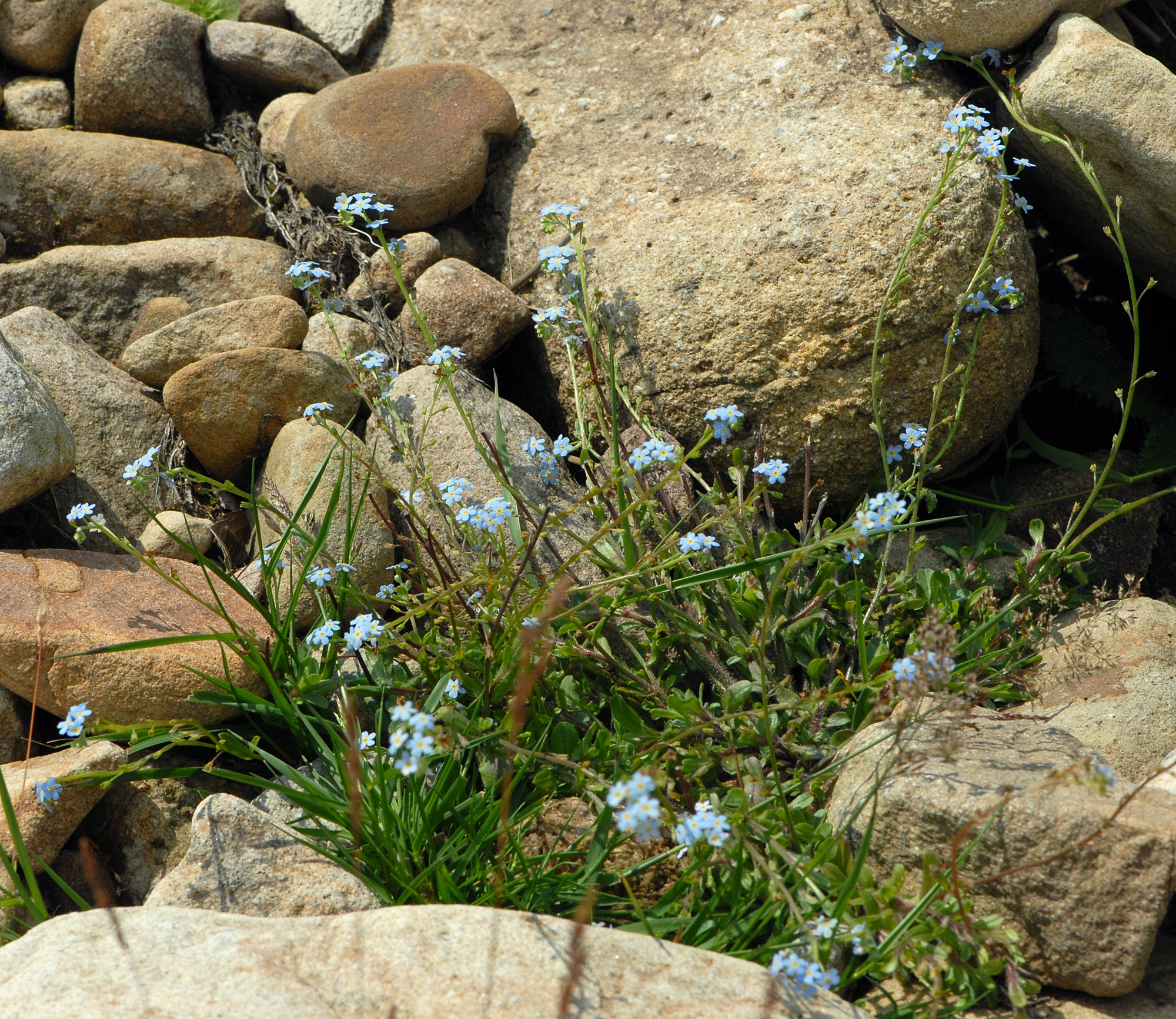
Myosotis x bollandica growing in Langden Valley Trough of Bowland, Lancashire, United Kingdom.

Myosotis × bollandica is native to the United Kingdom, where it was discovered within the Bowland Fells in the county of Lancashire. Populations are most commonly found within 400 meters of both parent species. Much like both parent species, Myosotis × bollandica can tolerate wet conditions and is associated with wetland habitats such as: river banks, springs, rills, seeps and streams. Populations decline and become replaced with more dominant plant species without grazing animals such as sheep to maintain their habitat. Other plant species which are commonly associated with Myosotis × bollandica include: Cardamine pratensis, Epilobium palustre, Carex echinata and Galium palustre.

== Etymology ==
The genus name Myosotis translates as 'mouse ear' in Greek, referring to the shape of the petals resembling a mouse's ear. However, the species name bollandica is a reference to the Bowland Fells, where the hybrid was first discovered.
