= Cyrtusa subtestacea =

Scientific classification
- Kingdom: Animalia
- Phylum: Arthropoda
- Class: Insecta
- Order: Coleoptera
- Suborder: Polyphaga
- Infraorder: Staphyliniformia
- Family: Leiodidae
- Genus: Cyrtusa
- Species: C. subtestacea

Binomial name
- Cyrtusa subtestacea (Gyllenhal, 1813)

Synonyms
- Amphicyllis picipennis LeConte, 1863; Anisotoma subtestacea Gyllenhal, 1813; Caenocyrta picipennis (LeConte, 1863); Cyrtusa picipennis (LeConte, 1863)

Species of beetle

Cyrtusa subtestacea is a species of round fungus beetle in the family Leiodidae. It is found in Europe and Northern Asia (excluding China) and North America.
