= Leiodes horni =

Scientific classification
- Domain: Eukaryota
- Kingdom: Animalia
- Phylum: Arthropoda
- Class: Insecta
- Order: Coleoptera
- Suborder: Polyphaga
- Infraorder: Staphyliniformia
- Family: Leiodidae
- Genus: Leiodes
- Species: L. horni

Binomial name
- Leiodes horni Hatch, 1957

Species of beetle

Leiodes horni is a species of round fungus beetle in the family Leiodidae. It is found in North America.
