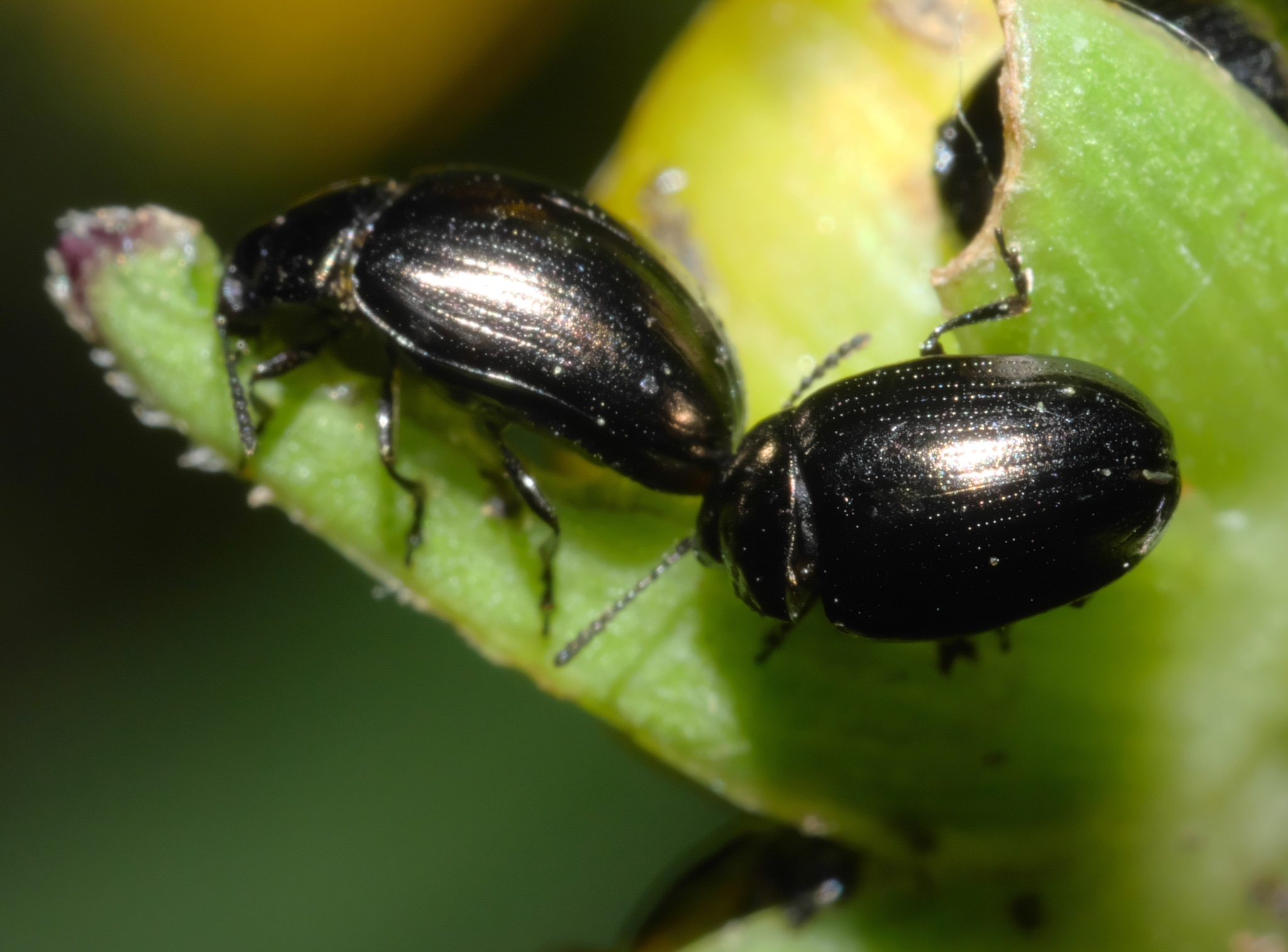
- Phaedon desotonis, Oklahoma

Scientific classification
- Kingdom: Animalia
- Phylum: Arthropoda
- Clade: Pancrustacea
- Class: Insecta
- Order: Coleoptera
- Suborder: Polyphaga
- Infraorder: Cucujiformia
- Family: Chrysomelidae
- Genus: Phaedon
- Species: P. desotonis

Binomial name
- Phaedon desotonis Balsbaugh, 1983

= Phaedon desotonis =

Species of beetle

Phaedon desotonis, known generally as the desoto leaf beetle or coreopsis leaf beetle, is a species of leaf beetle in the family Chrysomelidae. It is found in North America.
