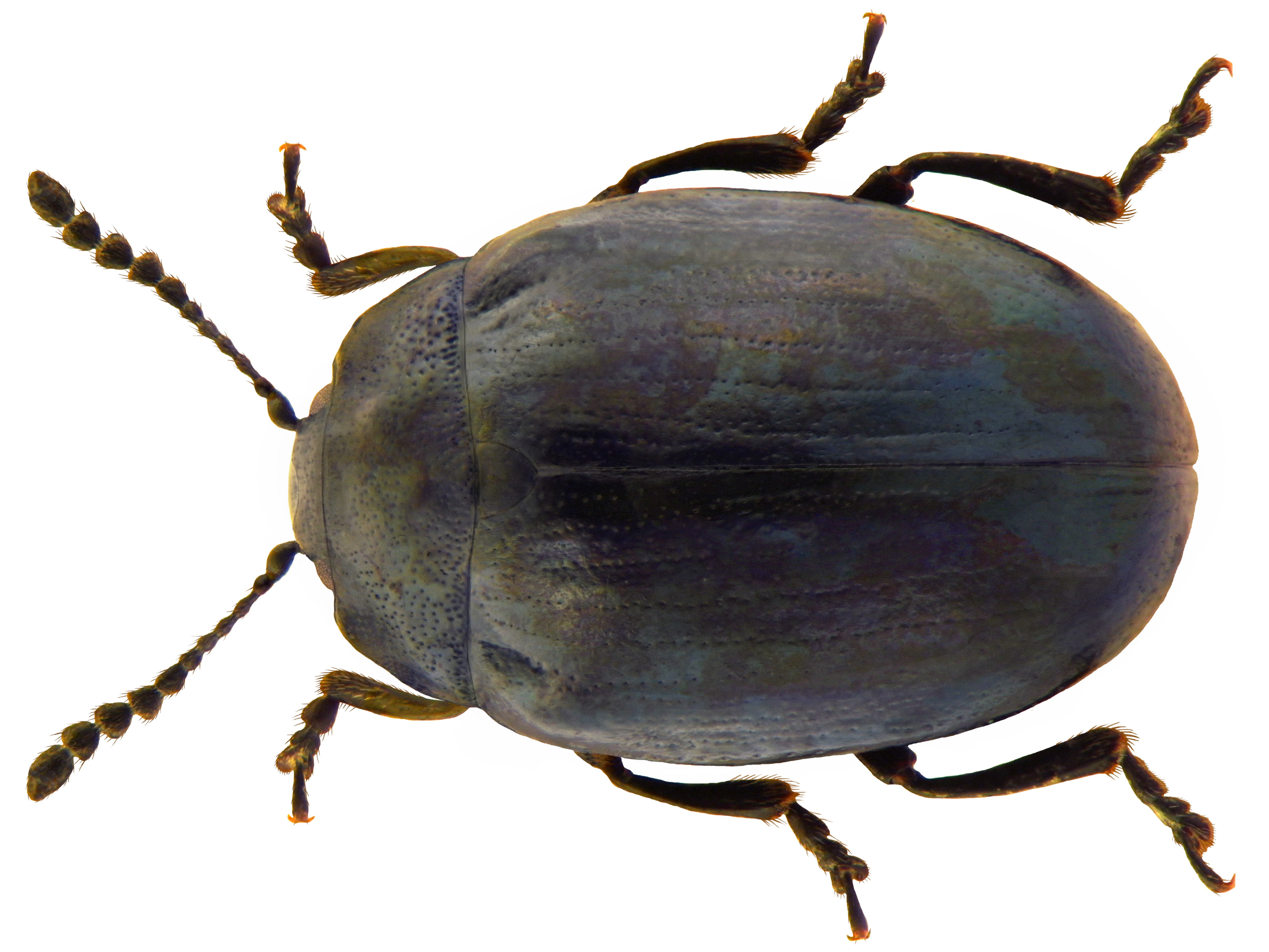
- Phaedon armoraciae 3-4 mm.

Scientific classification
- Kingdom: Animalia
- Phylum: Arthropoda
- Clade: Pancrustacea
- Class: Insecta
- Order: Coleoptera
- Suborder: Polyphaga
- Infraorder: Cucujiformia
- Family: Chrysomelidae
- Genus: Phaedon
- Species: P. armoraciae

Binomial name
- Phaedon armoraciae (Linnaeus, 1758)

Synonyms
- Chrysomela armoraciae Linnaeus, 1758

= Phaedon armoraciae =

Species of beetle

Phaedon armoraciae is a species of beetle in family Chrysomelidae. It is found in the Palearctic.
