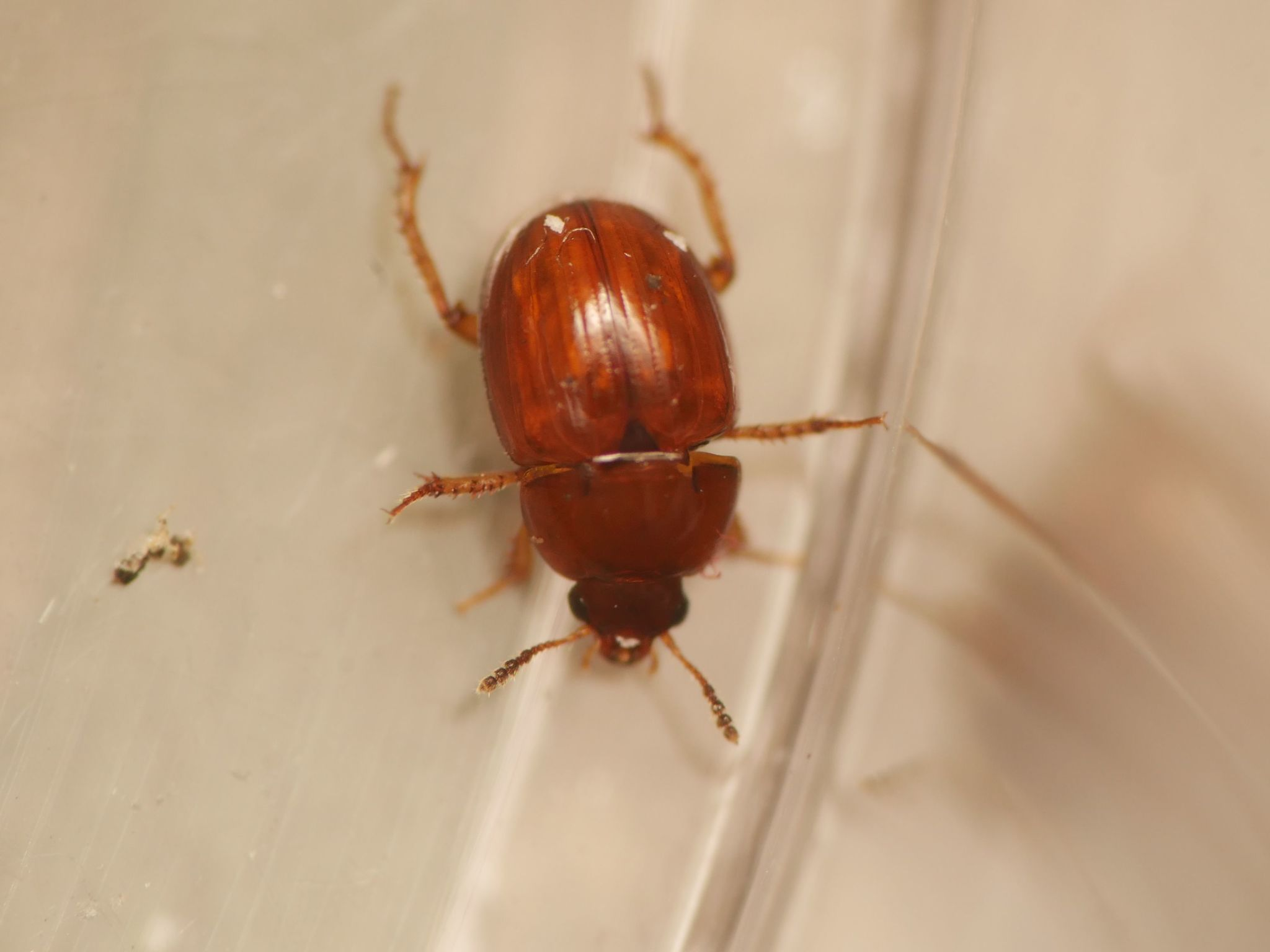
- Leiodes, Germany

Scientific classification
- Domain: Eukaryota
- Kingdom: Animalia
- Phylum: Arthropoda
- Class: Insecta
- Order: Coleoptera
- Suborder: Polyphaga
- Infraorder: Staphyliniformia
- Family: Leiodidae
- Subfamily: Leiodinae
- Tribe: Leiodini

= Leiodini =

Tribe of beetles

Leiodini is a tribe of round fungus beetles in the family Leiodidae. There are over 400 described species in Leiodini.

== Genera ==
These 19 genera belong to the tribe Leiodini:

- Afrocyrtusa Daffner, 1990
- Afroleiodes Peck, 2003
- Anogdus LeConte, 1866
- Chobautiella Reitter, 1900
- Cyrtusa Erichson, 1842
- Cyrtusamorpha Daffner, 1983
- Cyrtusoma Daffner, 1982
- Ecarinosphaerula Hatch, 1929
- Hypoliodes Portevin, 1908
- Incacyrtusa Daffner, 1990
- Isoplastus Horn, 1880
- Leiodes Latreille, 1797
- Liocyrtusa Daffner, 1982
- Lionothus W.J.Brown, 1937
- Ovocyrtusa Daffner, 1985
- Parvocyrtusa Peck & Cook, 2014
- Pseudolionothus Peck & Cook, 2014
- Xanthosphaera Fairmaire, 1859
- Zeadolopus Broun, 1903
