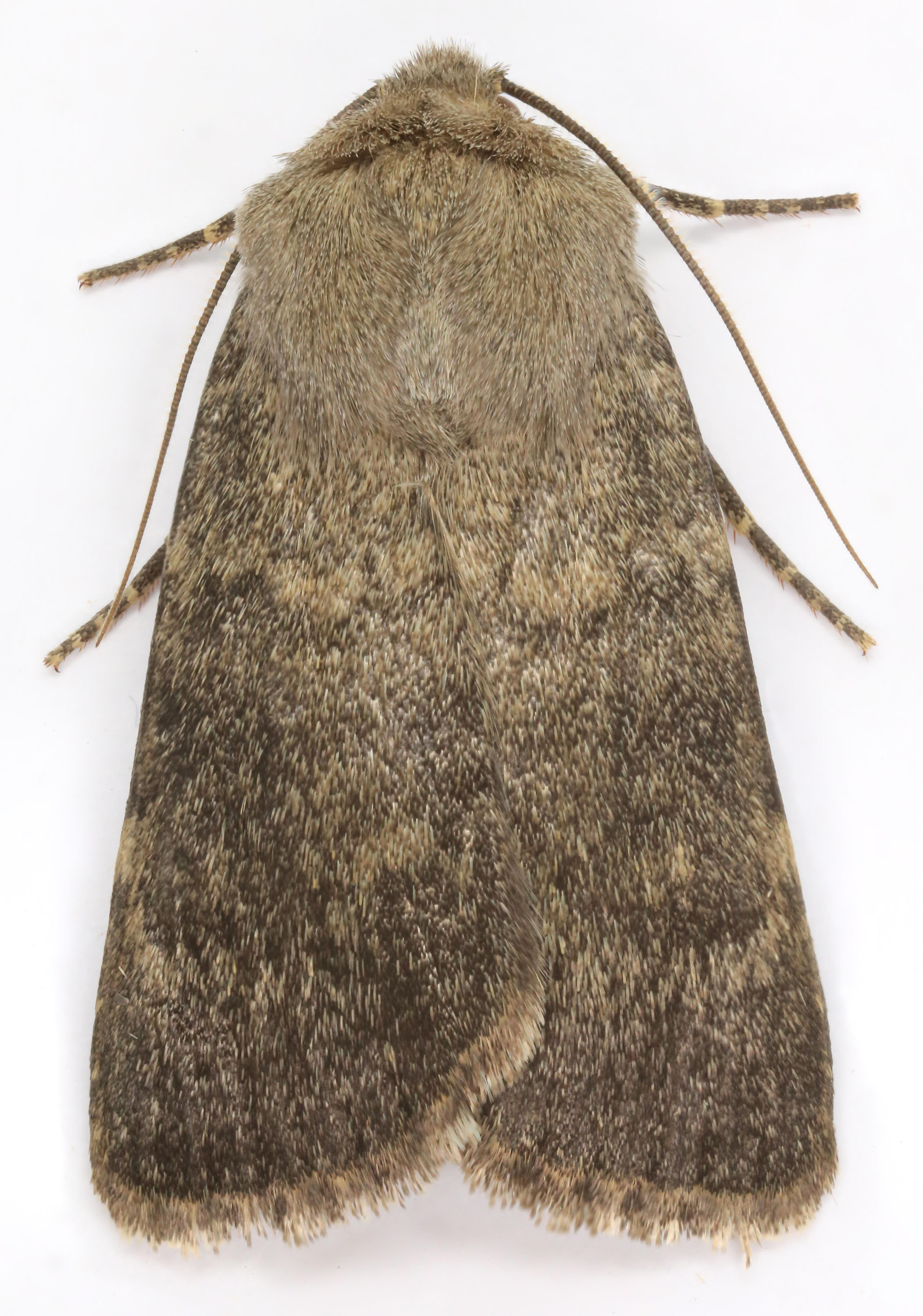

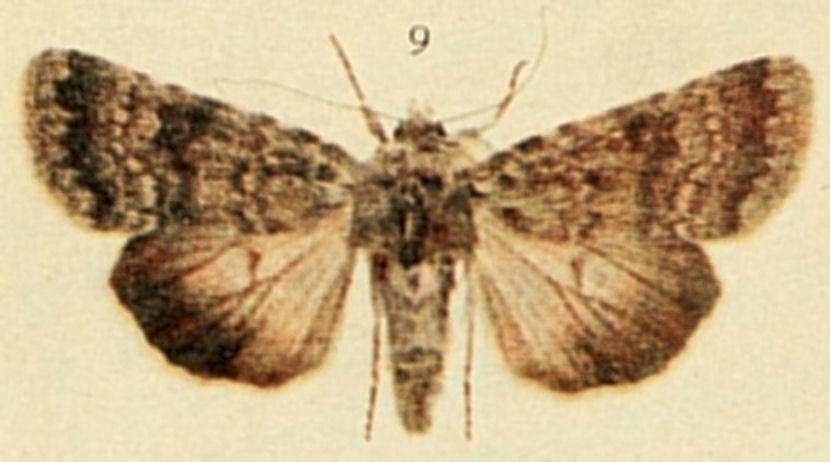

Scientific classification
- Kingdom: Animalia
- Phylum: Arthropoda
- Class: Insecta
- Order: Lepidoptera
- Superfamily: Noctuoidea
- Family: Noctuidae
- Genus: Standfussiana
- Species: S. lucernea

Binomial name
- Standfussiana lucernea (Linnaeus, 1758)

Synonyms
- Phalaena lucernea Linnaeus, 1758

= Standfussiana lucernea =

Northern rustic

Species of moth

Standfussiana lucernea, the northern rustic, is a moth of the family Noctuidae. It is found from the Iberian Peninsula, Italy and Greece in southern Europe, north through most of the continent up to Fennoscandia west to Ireland and Iceland.

== Technical description and variation ==
The wingspan is 36–46 mm. Forewing pale grey, with a green flush; lines black defined by pale grey; broad dark median and submarginal shades; orbicular stigma grey, pale-edged, generally obsolete; reniform a dark lunule; fringe grey; hindwing fuscous, darker towards termen; fringe white; the male is generally blacker than the female. The form from Scotland, to which Stephens gave the name renigera is blackish grey, much darker than European examples. cataleuca Boisd. has the dark median shade prominent.

== Biology ==
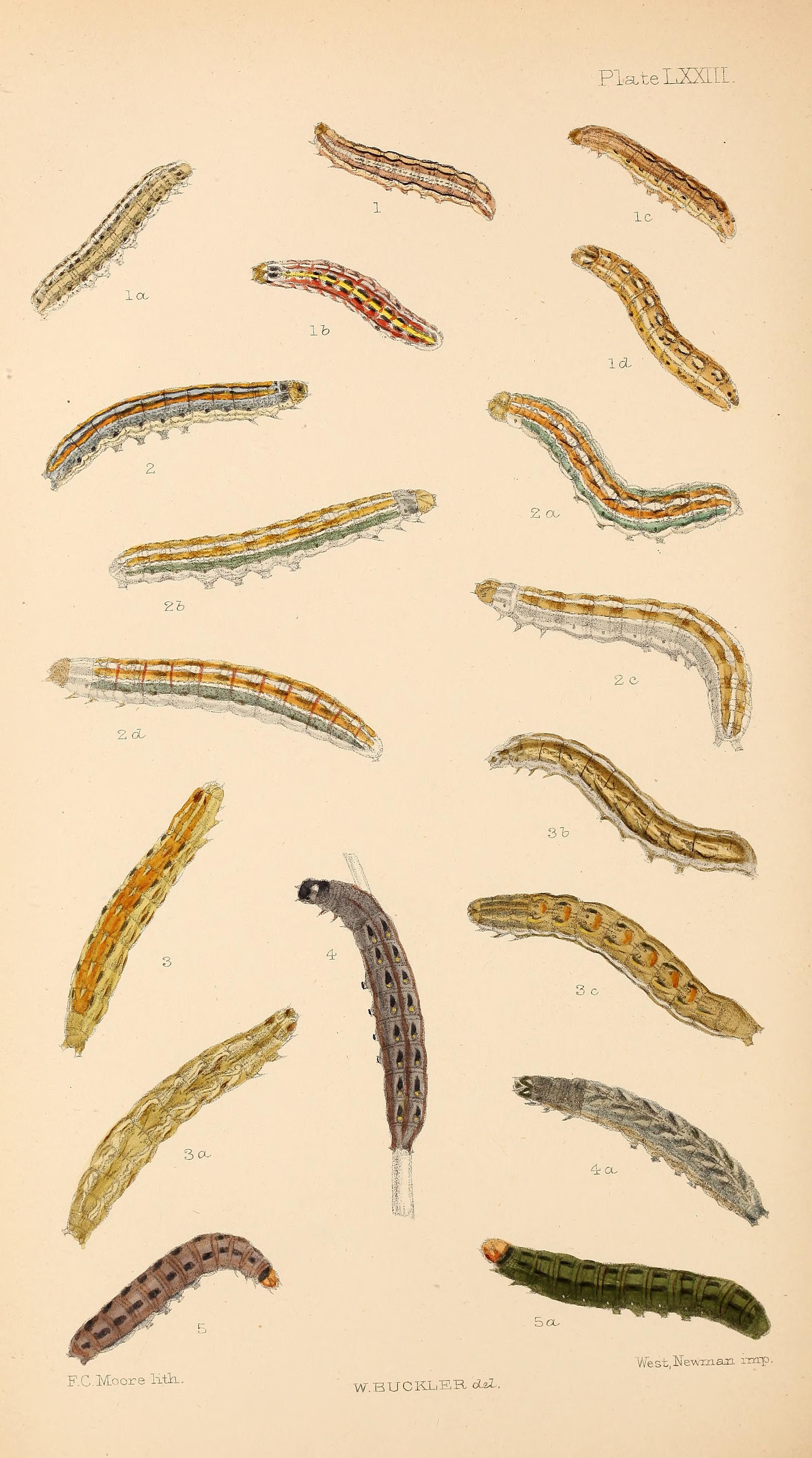
4,4a larva after last moult

Adults are on wing from July to August.

Larva blackish, with obscure markings; a subdorsal row of blackish dentate marks containing pale spots behind them. The larvae feed on various grasses and low plants including Sedum. Other recorded food plants include Arenaria, Campanula, Cerastium, Primula, Stellaria and Saxifraga species.

A mountain species, it is found in the Alps, Apennines, Carpathians and Balkan Mountains.

== Subspecies ==
- Standfussiana lucernea lucernea
- Standfussiana lucernea cataleuca
- Standfussiana lucernea arguta
- Standfussiana lucernea pescona
- Standfussiana lucernea illyrica
