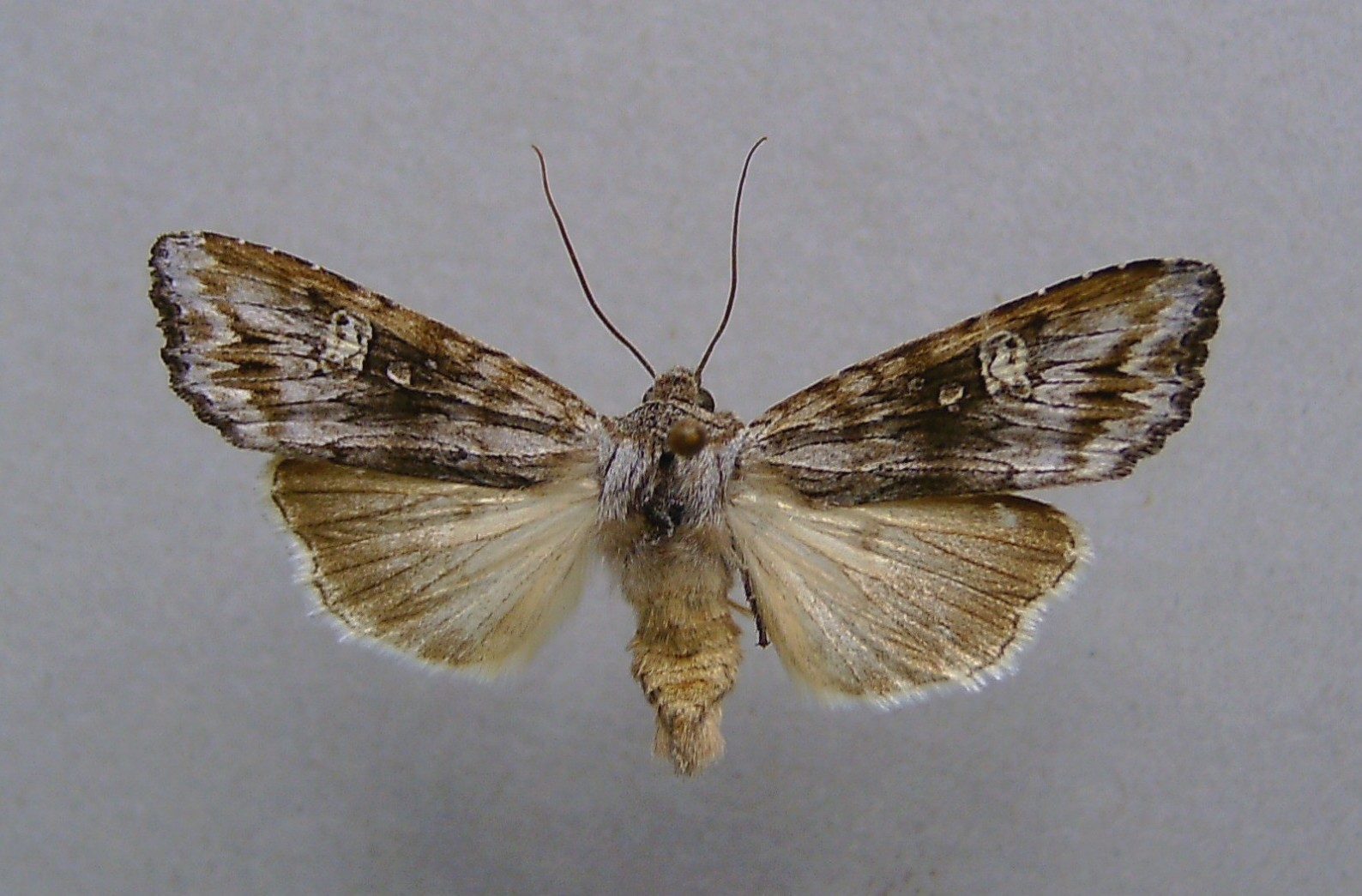

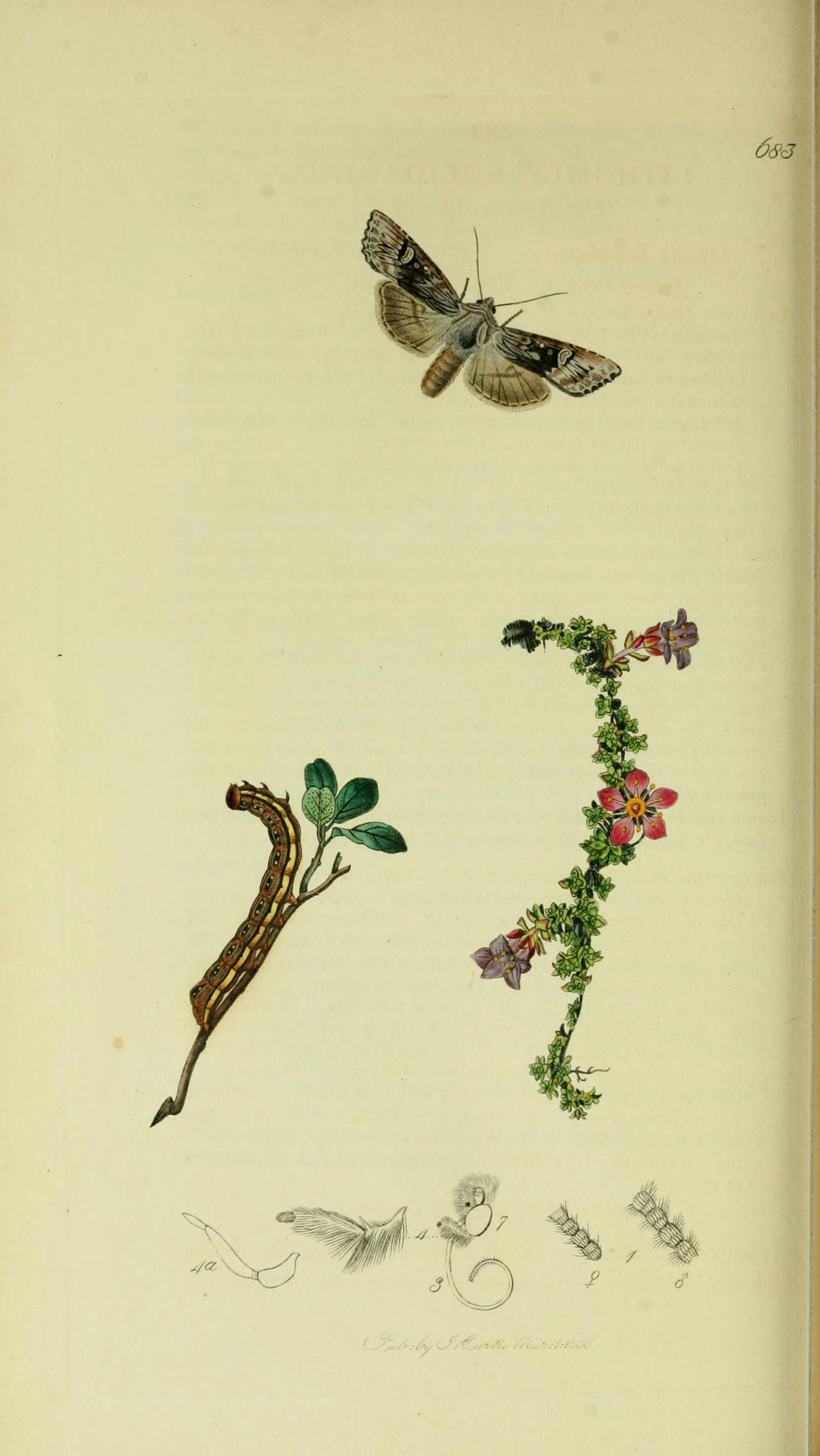

Scientific classification
- Domain: Eukaryota
- Kingdom: Animalia
- Phylum: Arthropoda
- Class: Insecta
- Order: Lepidoptera
- Superfamily: Noctuoidea
- Family: Noctuidae
- Genus: Lithomoia
- Species: L. solidaginis

Binomial name
- Lithomoia solidaginis (Hübner, [1803])

Synonyms
- Noctua solidaginis Hübner, [1803]; Xylena solidaginis (Hübner, [1803]); Calocampa solidaginis var. cinerascens Staudinger, 1871; Lithomoia pallida (Tutt, 1892); Lithomoia suffusa Tutt, 1902; Colocampa solidaginis var. rangnowi Stichel, 1908; Lithomia solidaginis

= Lithomoia solidaginis =

Species of moth

Lithomoia solidaginis, the golden-rod brindle, is a moth of the family Noctuidae. The species was first described by Jacob Hübner in 1803. It is found in most of Europe, except the Iberian Peninsula, Ireland, Iceland and the western and southern part of the Balkan Peninsula. Then eastwards to the Urals, Kamchatka and Japan.In the Alps it rises to about 1500 meters. It is found mainly on marshy ground, in humid mixed forests as well as in tundra - and taiga areas.

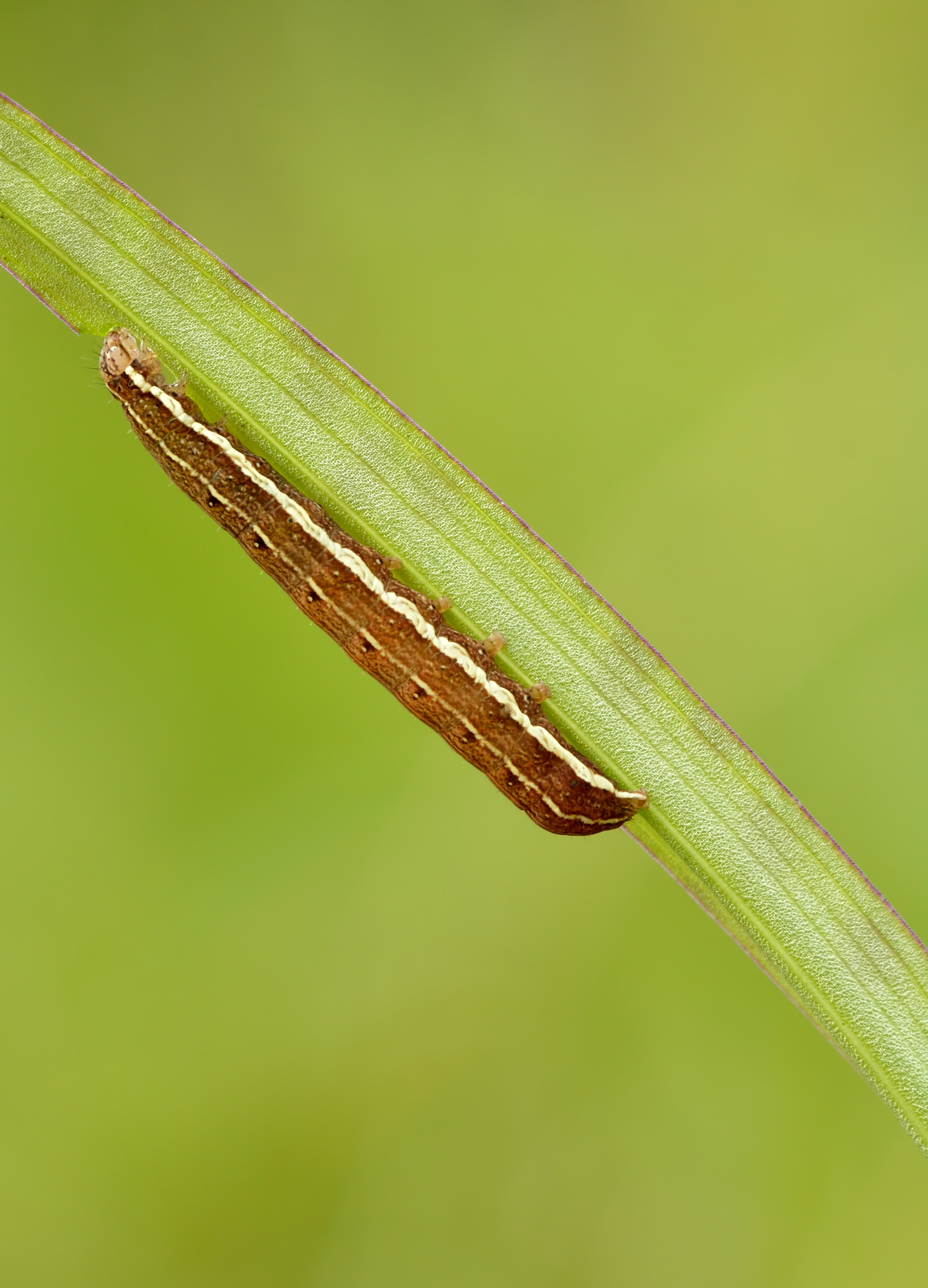
Larva

== Technical description and variation ==
Forewing pale bluish grey, with dark grey or blackish shadings and suffusion; veins finely black; a slender black line in and below base of cell; inner and outer lines double, dentate; submarginal line whitish, waved and dentate, preceded by a blackish shade containing black dentate marks; orbicular stigma double, formed of 2 round grey spots placed obliquely, the inner one often absent; reniform large, white and black; hindwing dirty grey, darker along termen; a dark grey cell spot; ab. cinerascens Stgr. is more uniformly grey, the markings not bright and conspicuous; ab. pallida Tutt is a very pale form from Cannock Chase, Britain; ab. obscura Lutzau is suffused with dark. Larva purplish brown; dorsal line blue grey, with darker edges; spiracular line broad, pale yellow, with fine black upper edge. The wingspan is 45–51 mm.

== Biology ==
Adults are on wing from August to September or early October and are attracted to sugar and occasionally to light. There is one generation per year.

The larvae feed on Myrica gale, Ribes uva-crispa, Sorbus aucuparia, Amelanchier confusa, Calluna, Vaccinium species (including Vaccinium myrtillus and Vaccinium uliginosum), Andromeda polifolia, Ledum palustre and Pedicularis palustris.
