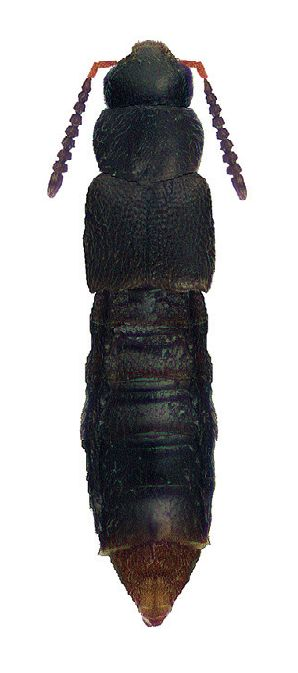
- Leptusa carolinensis

Scientific classification
- Kingdom: Animalia
- Phylum: Arthropoda
- Clade: Pancrustacea
- Class: Insecta
- Order: Coleoptera
- Suborder: Polyphaga
- Infraorder: Staphyliniformia
- Family: Staphylinidae
- Subtribe: Leptusina
- Genus: Leptusa; Kraatz, 1856

= Leptusa =

Genus of beetles

Leptusa is a genus of rove beetles in the family Staphylinidae. There are at least 20 described species in Leptusa.

== Species ==
- Leptusa atrocephala Bernhauer, 1905
- Leptusa bakeri (Casey, 1911)
- Leptusa brevicollis Casey, 1893
- Leptusa californiana Pace, 1989
- Leptusa canonica Casey, 1906
- Leptusa carolinensis Pace, 1989
- Leptusa cribratula (Casey, 1906)
- Leptusa elegans Blatchley, 1910
- Leptusa frontalis (Casey, 1893)
- Leptusa gatineauensis Klimaszewski and Pelletier in Klimaszewski, Pelletier and Majka, 2004
- Leptusa gimmeli
- Leptusa gracilis (Sachse, 1852)
- Leptusa jucunda Klimaszewski and Majka in Klimaszewski, Pelletier and Majka, 2004
- Leptusa laticollis Notman, 1921
- Leptusa nanula (Casey, 1893)
- Leptusa obscura Blatchley, 1910
- Leptusa opaca Casey, 1893
- Leptusa pseudopaca Klimaszewski and Majka in Klimaszewski, Pelletier and Majka, 2004
- Leptusa pusio (Casey, 1906)
- Leptusa smetanaiella Pace, 1989
- Leptusa smokyiensis Pace, 1989
- Leptusa virginica (Casey, 1911)
