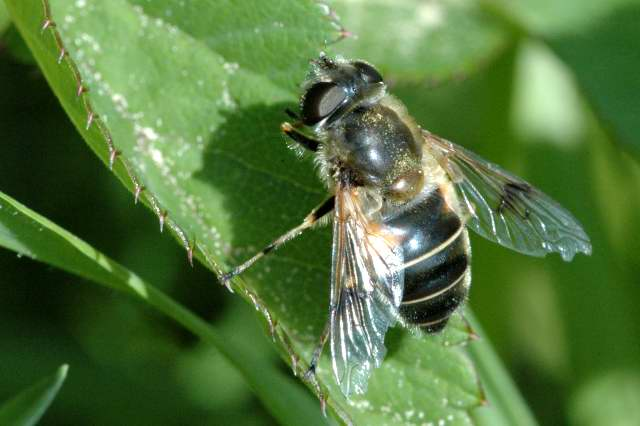
- Eristalis rupium female

Scientific classification
- Kingdom: Animalia
- Phylum: Arthropoda
- Clade: Pancrustacea
- Class: Insecta
- Order: Diptera
- Family: Syrphidae
- Genus: Eristalis
- Species: E. rupium

Binomial name
- Eristalis rupium Fabricius, 1805

Synonyms
- Eristalis vitripennis Goffe, 1944

= Eristalis rupium =

Species of fly

Eristalis rupium, commonly known as the spot-winged drone fly, is a species of syrphid fly that was first described by Fabricius in 1805. It is a common European species, and uncommon in North America. Hoverflies get their names from the ability to remain nearly motionless while in flight. The adults are also known as flower flies as they are commonly found around and on flowers, from which they get both energy-giving nectar and protein-rich pollen. The larvae are aquatic filter-feeders of the rat-tailed type, found in streams with clear water.

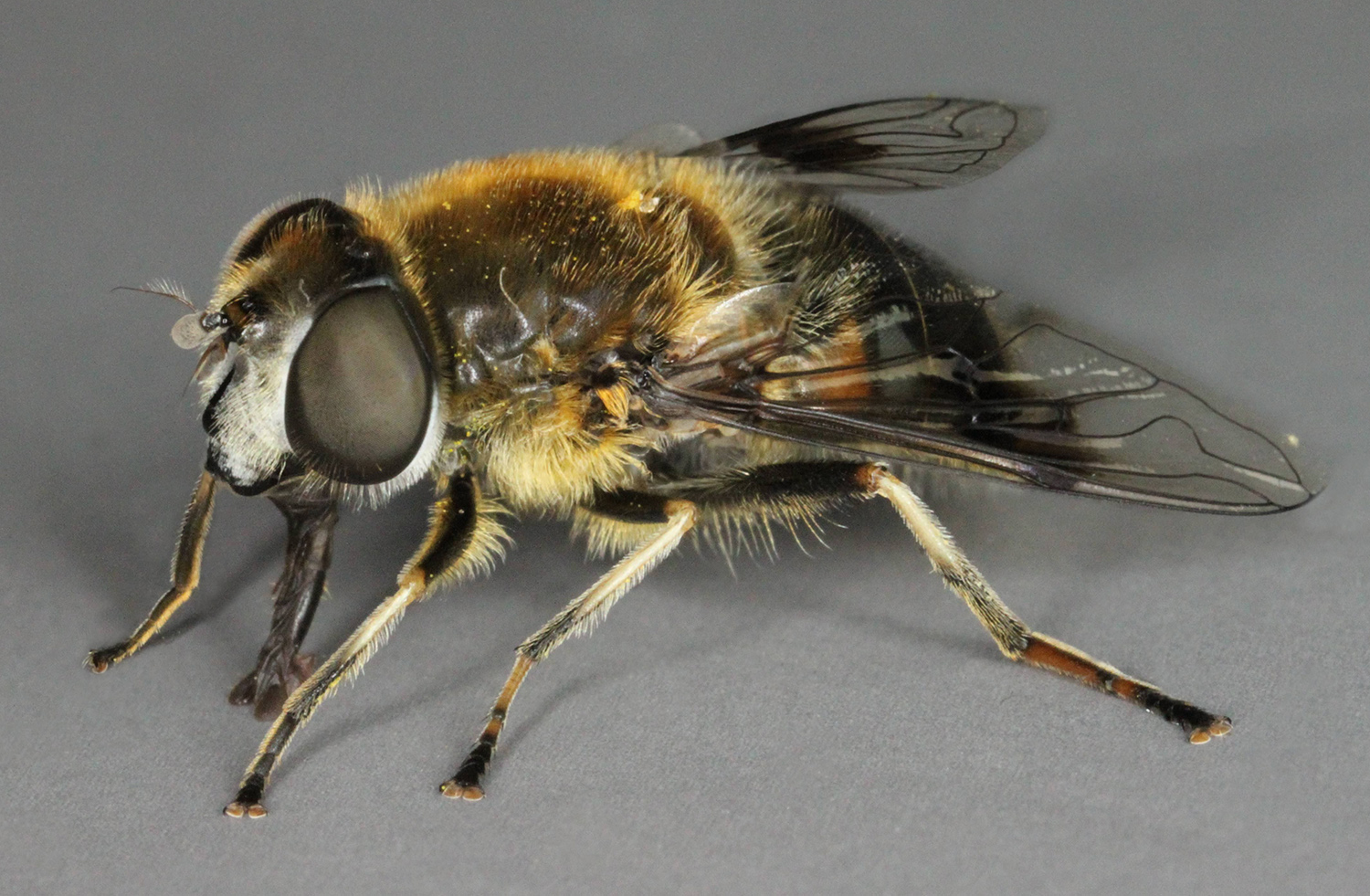
Eristalis rupium
