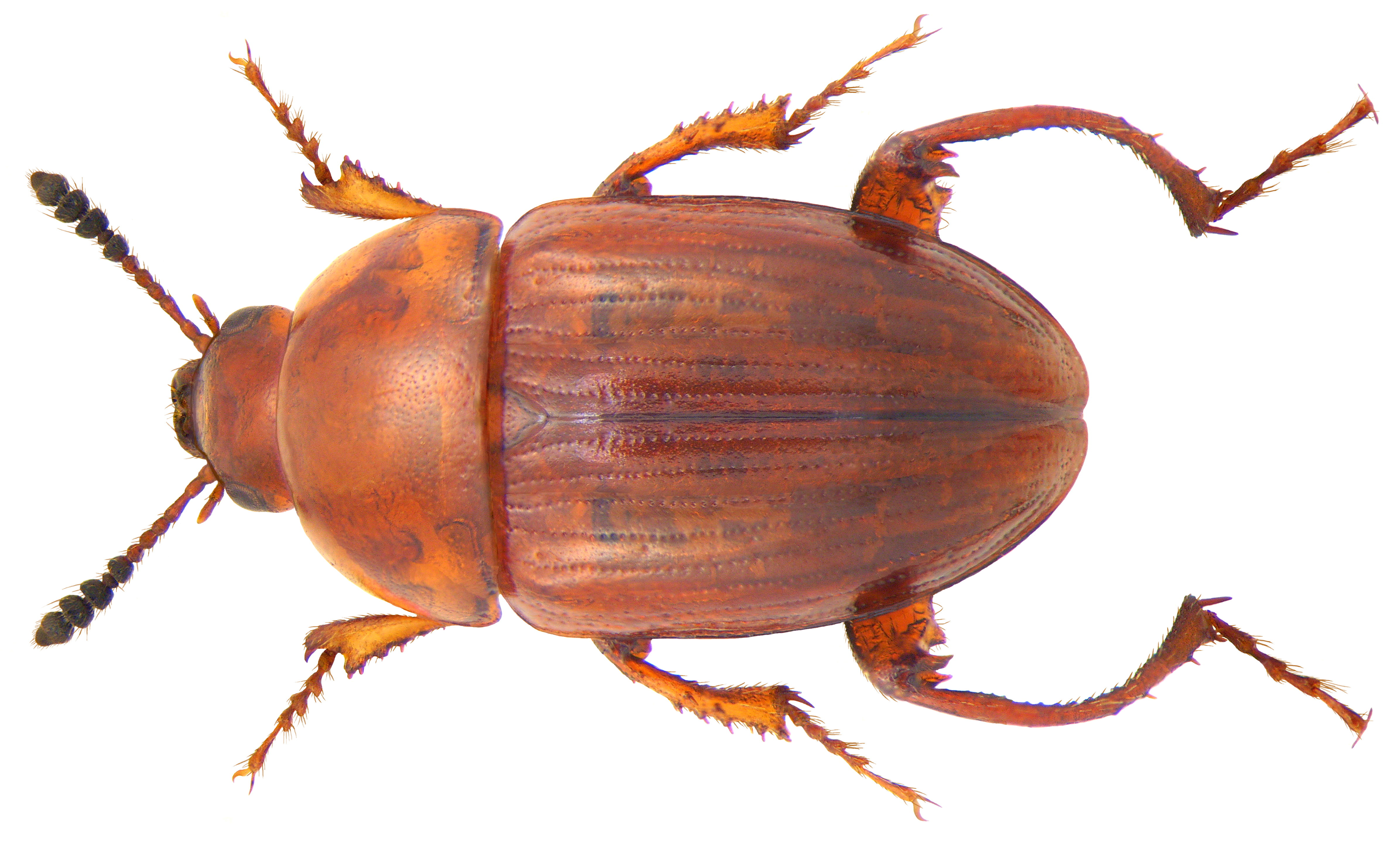
- Leiodes cinnamomea

Scientific classification
- Kingdom: Animalia
- Phylum: Arthropoda
- Class: Insecta
- Order: Coleoptera
- Suborder: Polyphaga
- Infraorder: Staphyliniformia
- Family: Leiodidae
- Subfamily: Leiodinae
- Tribe: Leiodini
- Genus: Leiodes; Latreille, 1797

= Leiodes =

Genus of beetles

Leiodes is a genus of round fungus beetles in the family Leiodidae. There are at least 110 described species in Leiodes.

ITIS Taxonomic note:

- Published before 13 Jan 1797 per Bouchard et al. (2011).

== See also ==
- List of Leiodes species
