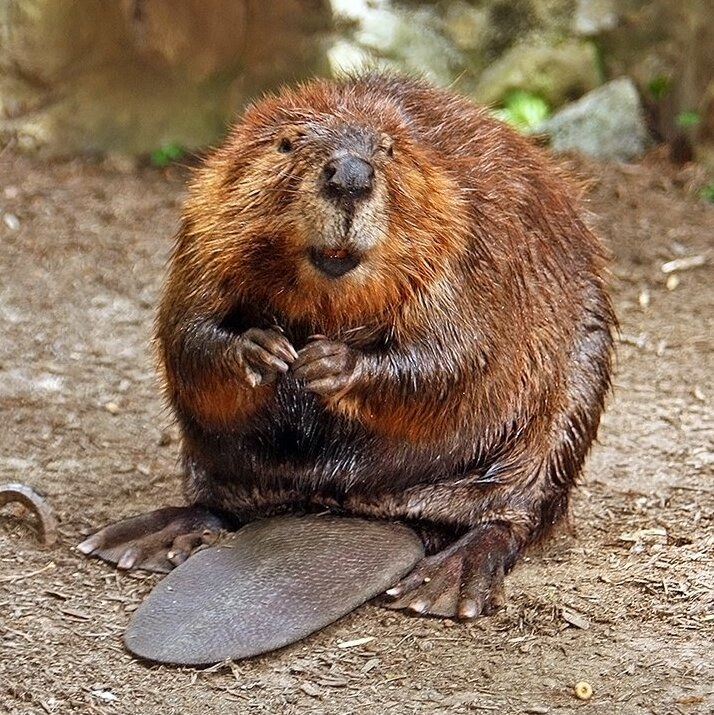
- North American beaver (Castor canadensis)

Scientific classification
- Kingdom: Animalia
- Phylum: Chordata
- Class: Mammalia
- Infraclass: Placentalia
- Order: Rodentia
- Family: Castoridae
- Subfamily: Castorinae
- Genus: Castor; Linnaeus (1758)

Type species
- Castor fiber Linnaeus, 1758

Species
- C. canadensis – North American beaver; C. fiber – Eurasian beaver; †C. californicus; †C. praefiber; †C. neglectus
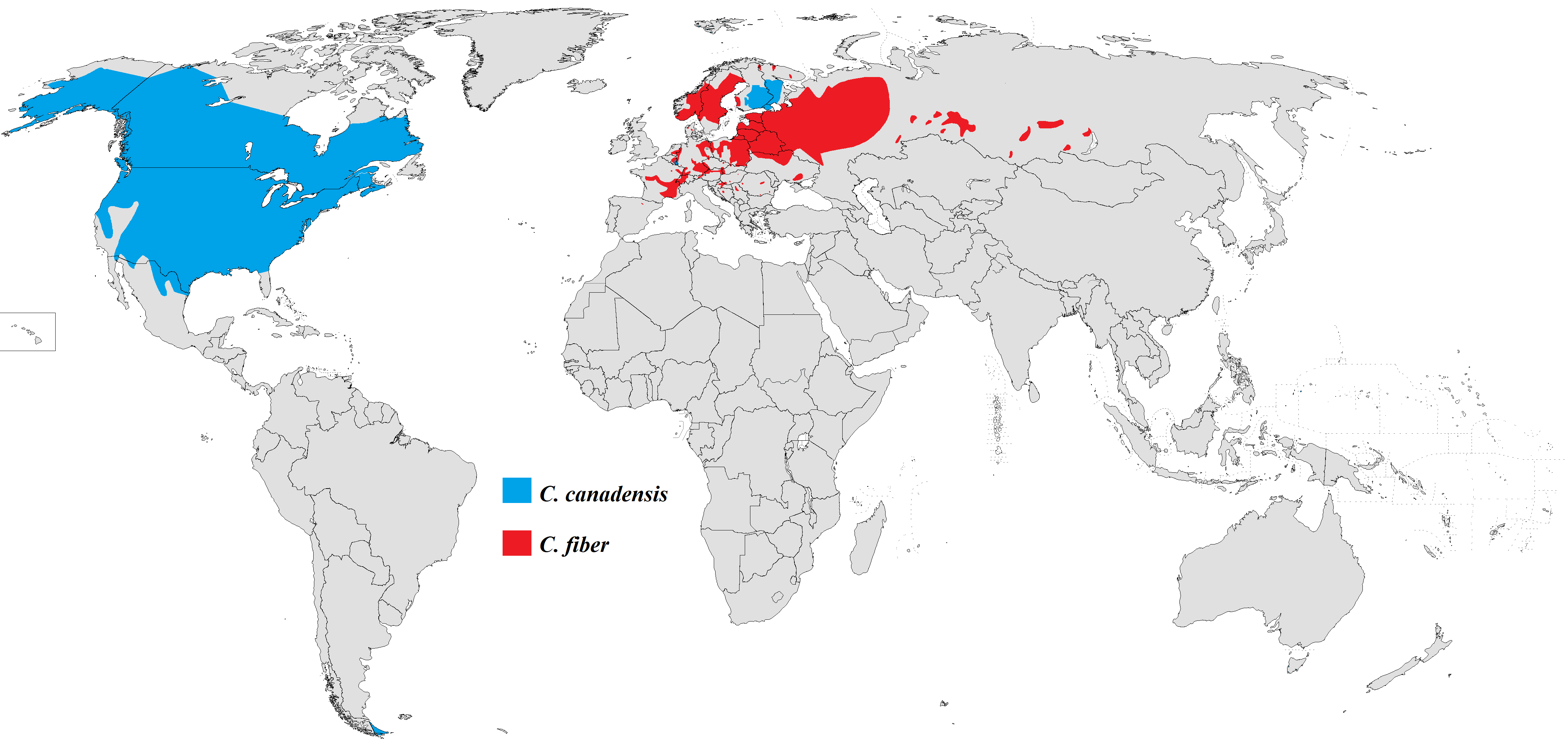
- Range of the living beavers as of 2016 (including introduced C. canadensis populations in Europe and Patagonia, but missing C. fiber populations in Mongolia and northwestern China, as well as reintroduced populations in the United Kingdom)

= Beaver =

Beaver Temporal range: Late Miocene – Recent

Semiaquatic rodent

Beavers (genus Castor) are large semiaquatic rodents of the Northern Hemisphere. There are two extant species: the North American beaver (Castor canadensis) and the Eurasian beaver (C. fiber). Beavers are the second-largest living rodents, after capybaras, weighing up to 50 kg (110 lb). They have stout bodies with large heads, long chisel-like incisors, brown or gray fur, hand-like front feet, webbed back feet, and tails that are flat and scaly. The two species differ in skull and tail shape and fur color. Beavers can be found in a number of freshwater habitats, such as rivers, streams, lakes and ponds. They are herbivorous, consuming tree bark, aquatic plants, grasses and sedges.

Beavers build dams and lodges using tree branches, vegetation, rocks and mud; they chew down trees for building material. Dams restrict water flow, forming ponds. Lodges, which are usually built in ponds, serve as shelters. Their infrastructure creates wetlands used by many other species, and because of their effect on other organisms in the ecosystem, beavers are considered a keystone species. Adult males and females live in monogamous pairs with their offspring. After their first year, the young help their parents repair dams and lodges; older siblings may also help raise newly born offspring. Beavers hold territories and mark them using scent mounds made of mud, debris, and castoreum—a liquid substance excreted through the beaver's urethra-based castor sacs. Beavers can also recognize their kin by their anal gland secretions and are more likely to tolerate them as neighbors.

Historically, beavers have been hunted for their fur, meat, and castoreum. Castoreum has been used in medicine, perfume, and food flavoring; beaver pelts have been a major driver of the fur trade. Before protections began in the 19th and early 20th centuries, overhunting had nearly exterminated both species. Their populations have since rebounded, and they are listed as species of least concern by the IUCN Red List of mammals. In human culture, the beaver symbolizes industriousness, especially in connection with construction; it is the national animal of Canada.

== Etymology ==
The English word beaver comes from the Old English word beofor or befor and is connected to the German word biber and the Dutch word bever. The ultimate origin of the word is an Indo-European root for 'brown'. Cognates of beaver are the source for several European placenames, including those of Beverley, Bièvres, Biberbach, Biebrich, Bibra, Bibern, Bibrka, Bobr, Bober, Bóbrka, Bjurholm, Bjurälven, and Bjurum. The genus name Castor has its origin in the Greek word κάστωρ kastōr and translates as 'beaver'.

== Taxonomy ==
Carl Linnaeus coined the genus name Castor as well as the specific (species) epithet fiber for the Eurasian species. German zoologist Heinrich Kuhl coined C. canadensis in 1820. Many scientists considered both names synonymous for one same species until the 1970s, when chromosomal evidence became available confirming both as separate where the Eurasian has 48 chromosomes, while the North American has 40. The difference in chromosome numbers prevents them from interbreeding. Twenty-five subspecies have been classified for C. canadensis, and nine have been classified for C. fiber.

There are two extant species: the North American beaver (Castor canadensis) and the Eurasian beaver (C. fiber). The Eurasian beaver is slightly longer and has a more lengthened skull, triangular nasal cavities (as opposed to the square ones of the North American species), a lighter fur color, and a narrower tail.

=== Evolution ===
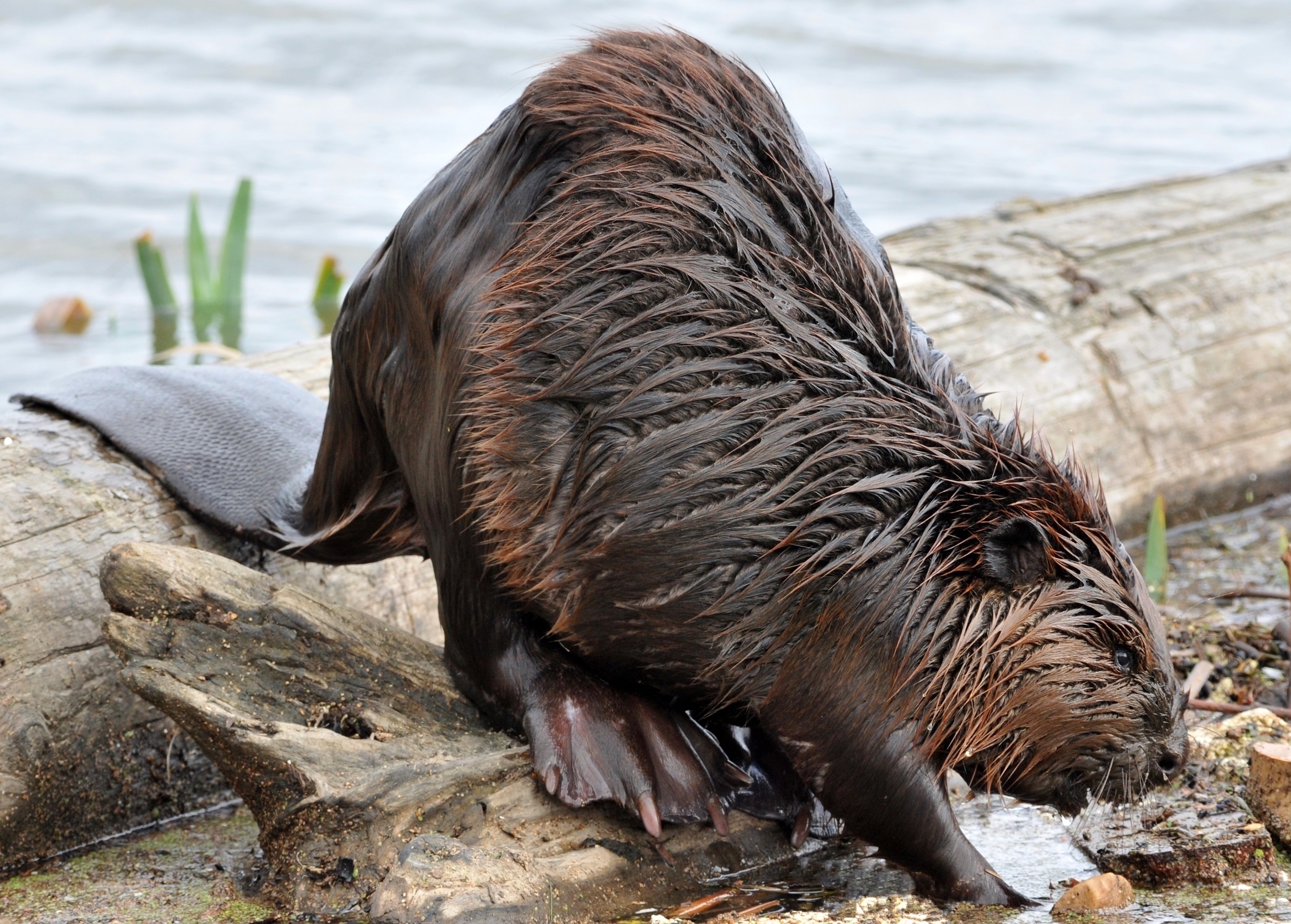
North American beaver (Castor canadensis)

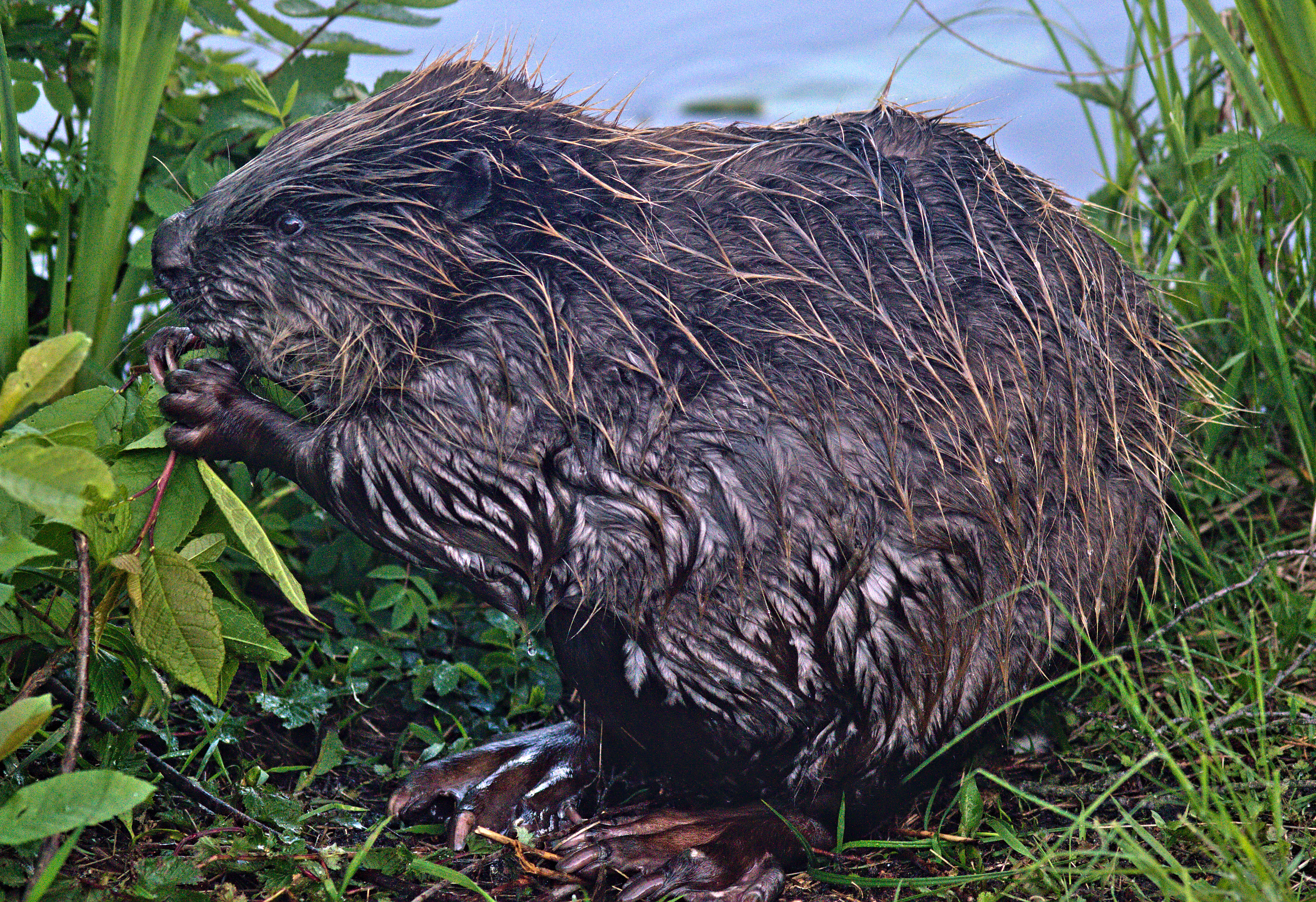
Eurasian beaver (Castor fiber)

- Castorimorpha
  - Castoroidea
    - Castoridae
      - Agnotocastor coloradensis
      - - - Agnotocastor praetereadens
          - - Anchitheriomys sp.
            - - Castorinae (modern beavers)
              - Castoroidinae
        - - Agnotocastor sp.
          - - Migmacastor procumbodens
            - Palaeocastorinae
  - Geomyoidea
    - Heteromyidae (kangaroo rats and allies)
    - Geomyidae (gophers)

Phylogeny of extant and extinct relatives of modern beavers based on genetics and morphology.

Beavers belong to the rodent suborder Castorimorpha, along with Heteromyidae (kangaroo rats and kangaroo mice), and the gophers. Modern beavers are the only extant members of the family Castoridae. They originated in North America in the late Eocene and colonized Eurasia via the Bering Land Bridge in the early Oligocene, coinciding with the Grande Coupure, a time of significant changes in animal species around 33 million years ago (myr).

The more basal castorids had several unique features: more complex occlusion between cheek teeth, parallel rows of upper teeth, premolars that were only slightly smaller than molars, the presence of a third set of premolars (P3), a hole in the stapes of the inner ear, a smooth palatine bone (with the palatine opening closer to the rear end of the bone), and a longer snout. More derived castorids have less complex occlusion, upper tooth rows that create a V-shape towards the back, larger second premolars compared to molars, absence of a third premolar set and stapes hole, a more grooved palatine (with the opening shifted towards the front), and reduced incisive foramen. Members of the subfamily Palaeocastorinae appeared in late-Oligocene North America. This group consisted primarily of smaller animals with relatively large front legs, a flattened skull, and a reduced tail—all features of a fossorial (burrowing) lifestyle.

In the early Miocene (about 24 mya), castorids evolved a semiaquatic lifestyle. Members of the subfamily Castoroidinae are considered to be a sister group to modern beavers, and included giants like Castoroides of North America and Trogontherium of Eurasia. Castoroides is estimated to have had a length of 1.9–2.2 m (6.2–7.2 ft) and a weight of 90–125 kg (198–276 lb). Fossils of one genus in Castoroidinae, Dipoides, have been found near piles of chewed wood, though Dipoides appears to have been an inferior woodcutter compared to Castor. Researchers suggest that modern beavers and Castoroidinae shared a bark-eating common ancestor. Dam and lodge-building likely developed from bark-eating, and allowed beavers to survive in the harsh winters of the subarctic. There is no conclusive evidence for this behavior occurring in non-Castor species.

The genus Castor likely originated in Eurasia. The earliest fossil remains appear to be C. neglectus, found in Germany and dated 12–10 mya. Mitochondrial DNA studies place the common ancestor of the two living species at around 8 mya. The ancestors of the North American beaver would have crossed the Bering Land Bridge around 7.5 mya. Castor may have competed with members of Castoroidinae, which led to niche differentiation. The fossil species C. praefiber was likely an ancestor of the Eurasian beaver. C. californicus from the Early Pleistocene of North America was similar to but larger than the extant North American beaver.

== Characteristics ==
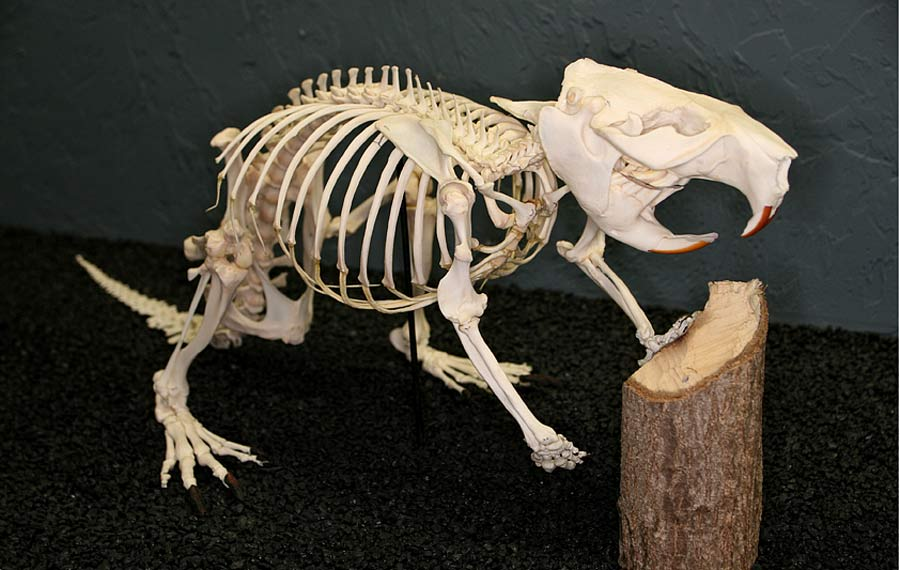
Mounted North American beaver skeleton.

Beavers are the second-largest living rodents, after capybaras. They have a head–body length of 80–120 cm (31–47 in), with a 25–50 cm (10–20 in) tail, a shoulder height of 30–60 cm (12–24 in), and generally weigh 11–30 kg (24–66 lb), but can be as heavy as 50 kg (110 lb). Males and females are almost identical externally. Their bodies are streamlined like marine mammals and their robust build allows them to pull heavy loads. A beaver coat has 12,000–23,000 hairs/cm^{2} (77,000–148,000 hairs/in^{2}) and functions to keep the animal warm, to help it float in water, and to protect it against predators. Guard hairs are 5–6 cm (2.0–2.4 in) long and typically reddish brown, but can range from yellowish brown to nearly black. The underfur is 2–3 cm (0.8–1.2 in) long and dark gray. Beavers molt every summer.

Beavers have large skulls with powerful chewing muscles. They have four chisel-shaped incisors that continue to grow throughout their lives. The incisors are covered in a thick enamel that is colored orange or reddish-brown by iron compounds. The lower incisors have roots that are almost as long as the entire lower jaw. Beavers have one premolar and three molars on all four sides of the jaws, adding up to 20 teeth. The molars have meandering ridges for grinding woody material. The eyes, ears and nostrils are arranged so that they can remain above water while the rest of the body is submerged. The nostrils and ears have valves that close underwater, while nictitating membranes cover the eyes. To protect the larynx and trachea from water flow, the epiglottis is contained within the nasal cavity instead of the throat. In addition, the back of the tongue can rise and create a waterproof seal. A beaver's lips can close behind the incisors, preventing water from entering their mouths as they cut and bite onto things while submerged.

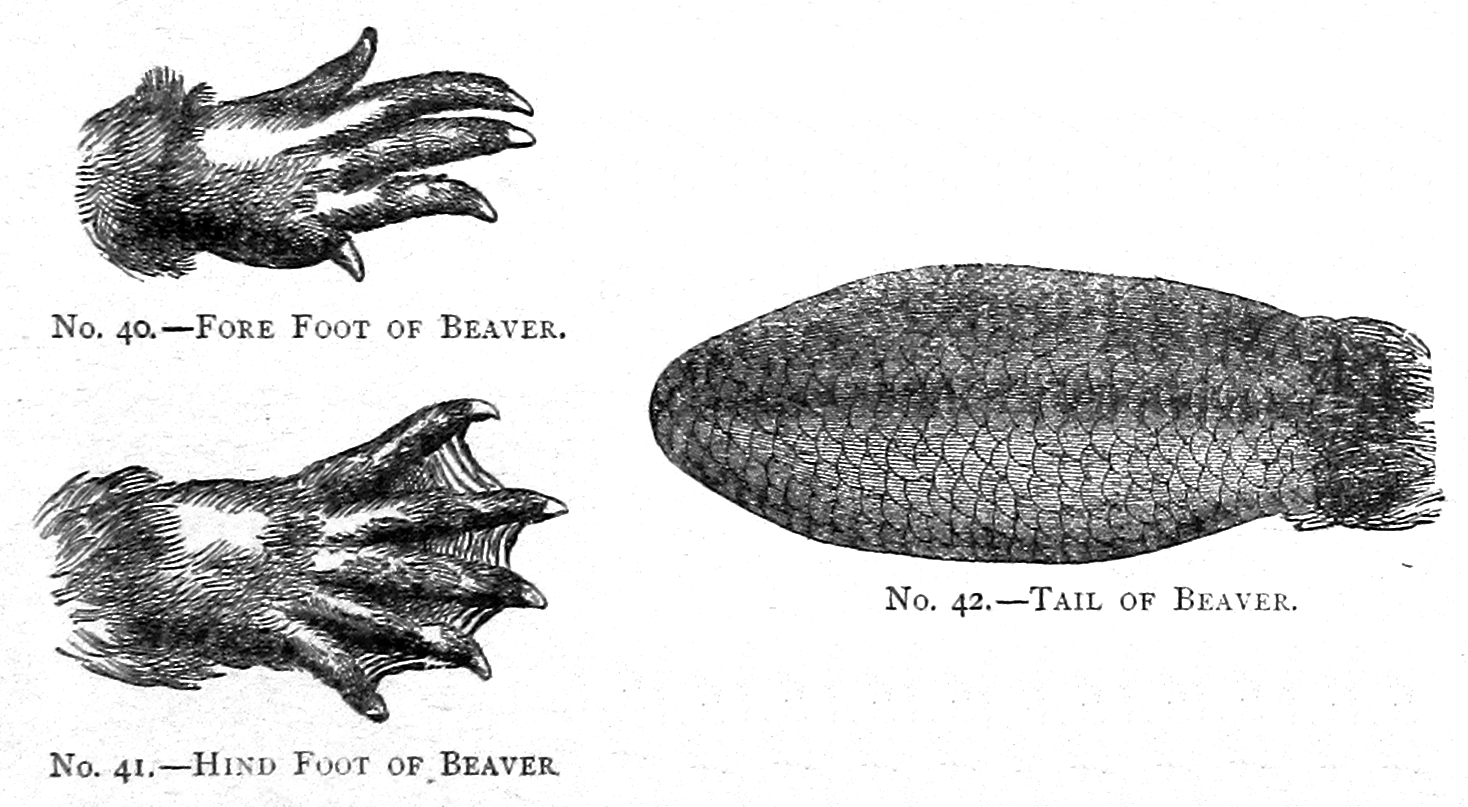
The fore foot, hind foot, and tail of a beaver.

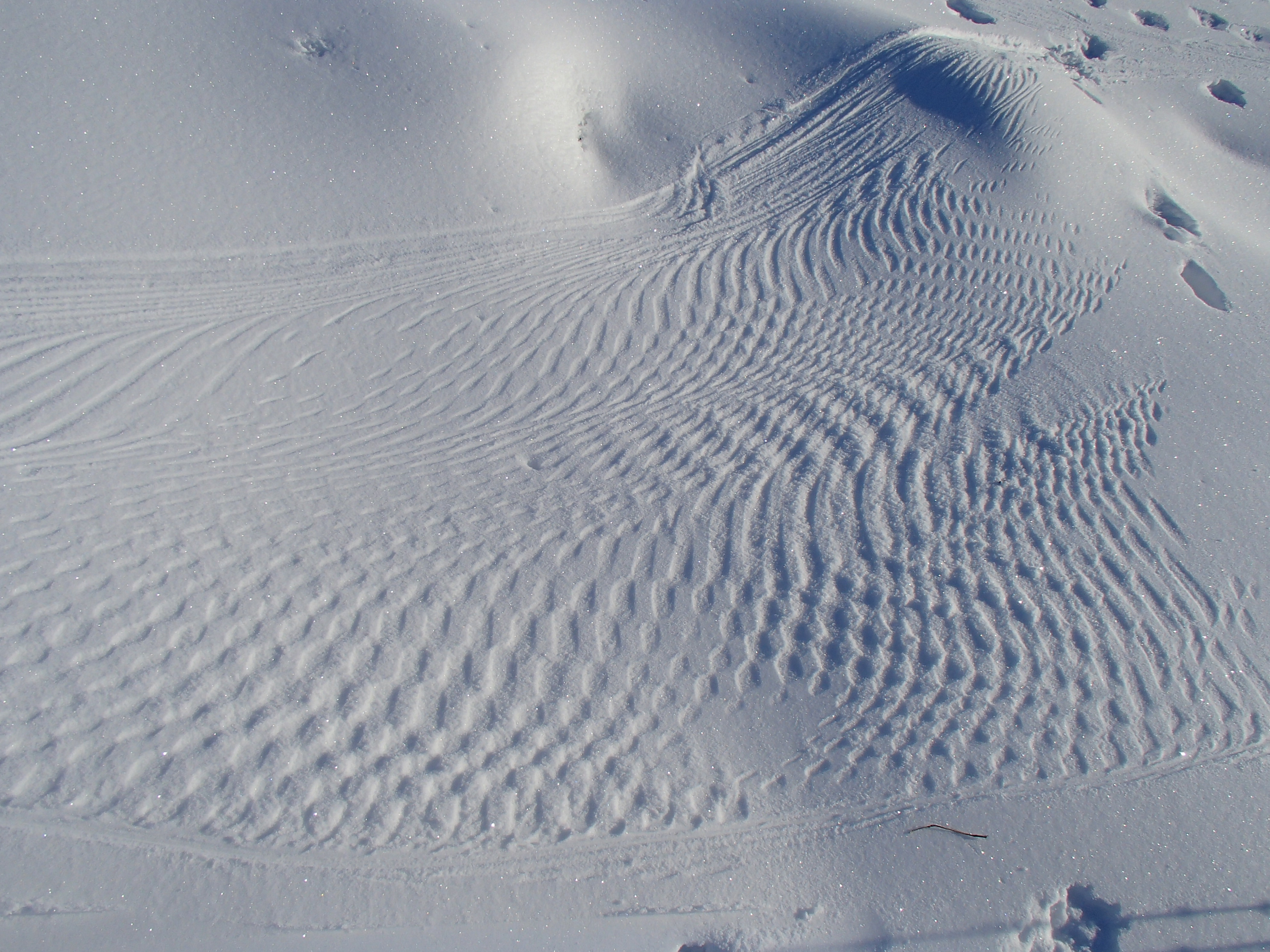
Beaver tail and footprints on snow.

The beaver's front feet are dexterous, allowing them to grasp and manipulate objects and food, as well as dig. The hind feet are larger and have webbing between the toes, and the second innermost toe has a "double nail" used for grooming. Beavers can swim at 8 km/h (5 mph); only their webbed hind feet are used to swim, while the front feet fold under the chest. On the surface, the hind limbs thrust one after the other; while underwater, they move at the same time. Beavers are awkward on land but can move quickly when they feel threatened. They can carry objects while walking on their hind legs.

The beaver's distinctive tail has a conical, muscular, hairy base; the remaining two-thirds of the appendage is flat and scaly. The tail has multiple functions: it provides support for the animal when it is upright (such as when chewing down a tree), acts as a rudder when it is swimming, and stores fat for winter. It also has a countercurrent blood vessel system which allows the animal to lose heat in warm temperatures and retain heat in cold temperatures.

The beaver's sex organs are inside the body, and the male's penis has a cartilaginous baculum. They have only one opening, a cloaca, which is used for reproduction, scent-marking, defecation, and urination. The cloaca evolved secondarily, as most mammals have lost this feature, and may reduce the area vulnerable to infection in dirty water. The beaver's intestine is six times longer than its body, and the caecum is double the volume of its stomach. Microorganisms in the caecum allow them to process around 30 percent of the cellulose they eat. A beaver defecates in the water, leaving behind balls of sawdust. Female beavers have four mammary glands; these produce milk with 19 percent fat, a higher fat content than other rodents. Beavers have two pairs of glands: castor sacs, which are part of the urethra, and anal glands. The castor sacs secrete castoreum, a liquid substance used mainly for marking territory. Anal glands produce an oily substance which the beaver uses as a waterproof ointment for its coat. The substance plays a role in individual and family recognition. Anal secretions are darker in females than males among Eurasian beavers, while the reverse is true for the North American species.

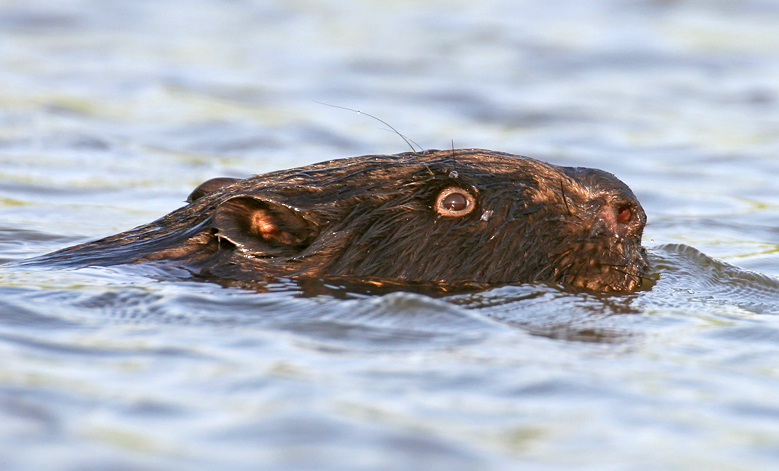
Eurasian beaver swimming.

Compared to many other rodents, a beaver's brain has a hypothalamus significantly smaller than the cerebrum; this indicates a relatively advanced brain with higher intelligence. The cerebellum is large, allowing the animal to move within a three-dimensional space (such as underwater) similar to tree-climbing squirrels. The neocortex is devoted mainly to touch and hearing. Touch is more advanced in the lips and hands than the whiskers and tail. Vision in the beaver is relatively poor; the beaver eye cannot see as well underwater as an otter. Beavers have a good sense of smell, which they use for detecting land predators and for inspecting scent marks, food, and other individuals.

Beavers can hold their breath for as long as 15 minutes but typically remain underwater for no more than five or six minutes. Dives typically last less than 30 seconds and are usually no more than 1 m (3 ft 3 in) deep. When diving, their heart rate decreases to 60 beats per minute, half its normal pace, and blood flow is directed more towards the brain. A beaver's body also has a high tolerance for carbon dioxide. When surfacing, the animal can replace 75 percent of the air in its lungs in one breath, compared to 15 percent for a human.

== Distribution and status ==
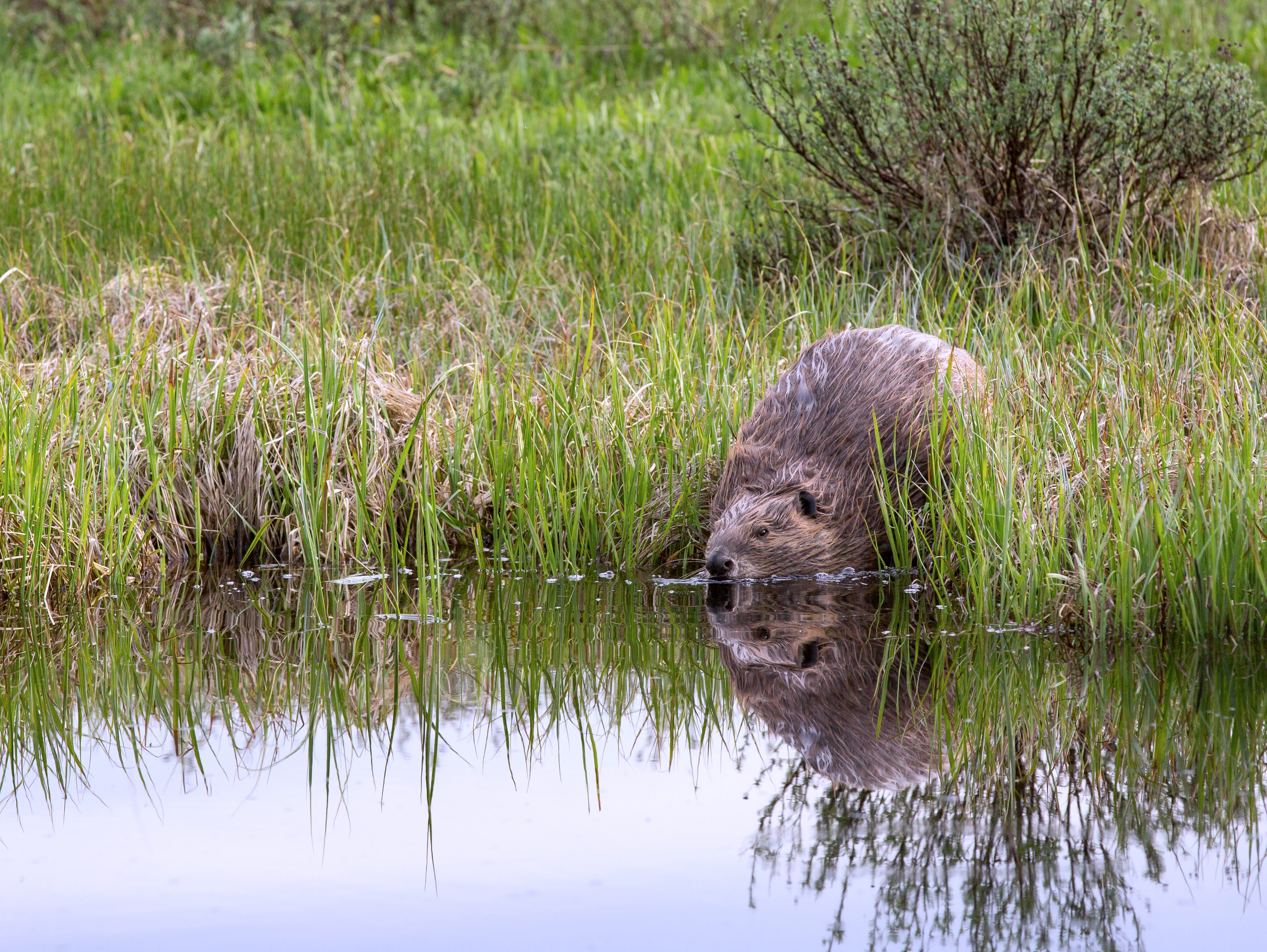
North American beaver in Yellowstone National Park.

The IUCN Red List of mammals lists both beaver species as least concern. The North American beaver is widespread throughout most of the United States and Canada and can be found in northern Mexico. The species was introduced to Finland in 1937 (and then spread to northwestern Russia) and to Tierra del Fuego, Patagonia, in 1946. As of 2019, the introduced population of North American beavers in Finland has been moving closer to the habitat of the Eurasian beaver. Historically, the North American beaver was trapped and nearly extirpated because its fur was highly sought after. Protections have allowed the beaver population on the continent to rebound to an estimated 6–12 million by the late 20th century; still far lower than the originally estimated 60–400 million North American beavers before the fur trade. The introduced population in Tierra del Fuego is estimated at 35,000–50,000 individuals as of 2016.

The Eurasian beaver's range historically included much of Eurasia, but was decimated by hunting by the early 20th century. In Europe, beavers were reduced to fragmented populations, with combined population numbers being estimated at 1,200 individuals for the Rhône of France, the Elbe in Germany, southern Norway, the Neman river and Dnieper Basin in Belarus, and the Voronezh river in Russia. The beaver has since recolonized parts of its former range, aided by conservation policies and reintroductions. Beaver populations now range across western, central, and eastern Europe, and western Russia and the Scandinavian Peninsula. Beginning in 2009, beavers have been successfully reintroduced to parts of Great Britain. In 2020, the total Eurasian beaver population in Europe was estimated at over one million. Small native populations are also present in Mongolia and northwestern China. In 2016 their numbers were estimated at 150 and 700, respectively. Under New Zealand's Hazardous Substances and New Organisms Act 1996, beavers are classed as a "prohibited new organism" preventing them from being introduced into the country.

== Ecology ==
Eurasian beavers swimming and foraging.

Beavers live in freshwater ecosystems such as rivers, streams, lakes and ponds. Water is the most important component of beaver habitat; they swim and dive in it, and it provides them refuge from land predators. It also restricts access to their homes and allows them to move building objects more easily. Beavers prefer slower moving streams, typically with a gradient (steepness) of one percent, though they have been recorded using streams with gradients as high as 15 percent. Beavers are found in wider streams more often than in narrower ones. They also prefer areas with no regular flooding and may abandon a location for years after a significant flood.

Beavers typically select flat landscapes with diverse vegetation close to the water. North American beavers prefer trees being 60 m (200 ft) or less from the water, but will roam several hundred meters to find more. Beavers have also been recorded in mountainous areas. Dispersing beavers will use certain habitats temporarily before finding their ideal home. These include small streams, temporary swamps, ditches, and backyards. These sites lack important resources, so the animals do not stay there permanently. Beavers have increasingly settled at or near human-made environments, including agricultural areas, suburbs, golf courses, and shopping malls.

=== Food and feeding ===
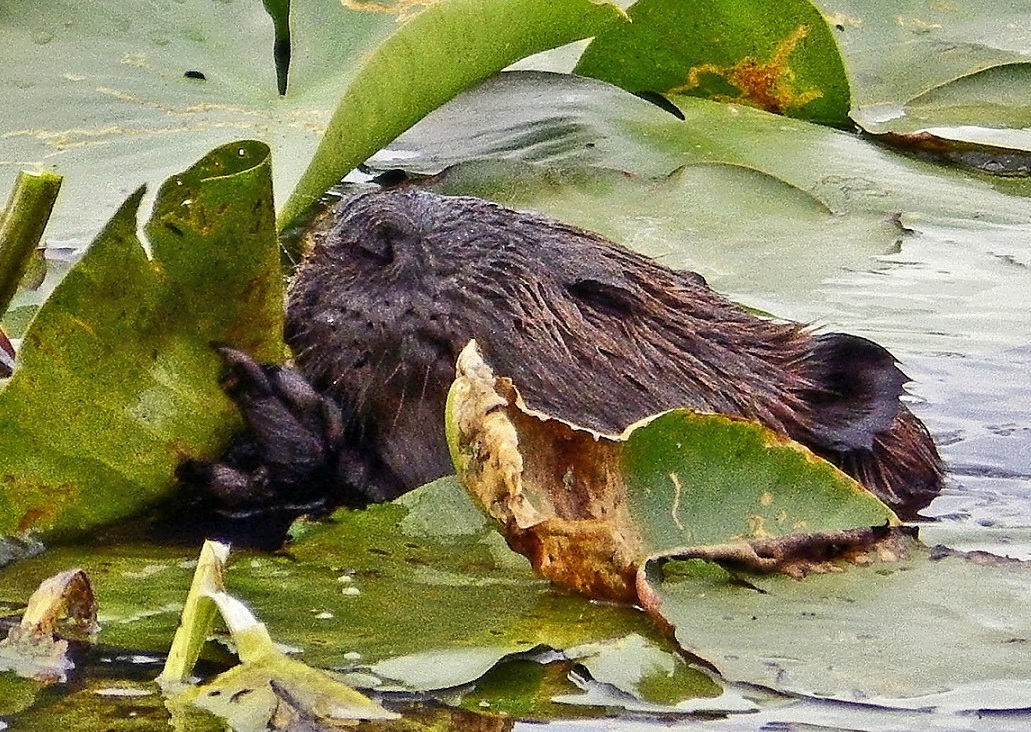
North American beaver eating lily pads.

Beavers have an herbivorous and a generalist diet. During the spring and summer, they mainly feed on herbaceous plant material such as leaves, roots, herbs, ferns, grasses, sedges, water lilies, water shields, rushes, and cattails. During the fall and winter, they eat more bark and cambium of woody plants; tree and shrub species consumed include aspen, birch, oak, dogwood, willow and alder. There is some disagreement about why beavers select specific woody plants; some research has shown that beavers more frequently select species which are more easily digested, while others suggest beavers principally forage based on stem size.

Beavers may cache their food for the winter, piling wood in the deepest part of their pond where it cannot be reached by other browsers. This cache is known as a "raft"; when the top becomes frozen, it creates a "cap". The beaver accesses the raft by swimming under the ice. Many populations of Eurasian beaver do not make rafts, but forage on land during winter.

=== Infrastructure ===
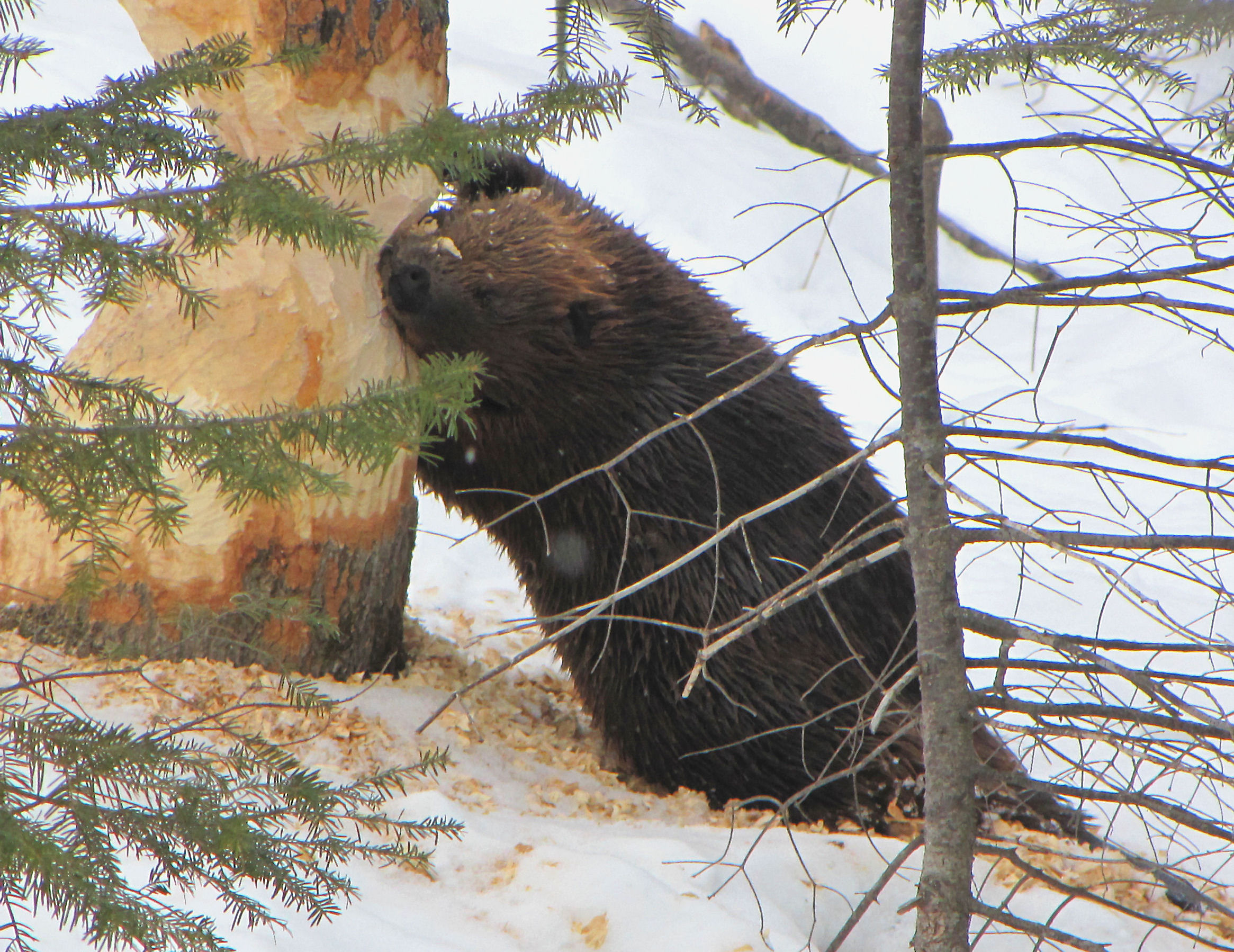
North American beaver chewing down a tree.

Beavers need trees and shrubs to use as building material for dams, which restrict flowing water to create a pond for them to live in, and for lodges, which act as shelters and refuges from predators and the elements. Without such material, beavers dig burrows into a bank to live. Dam construction begins in late summer or early fall, and they repair them whenever needed. Beavers can cut down trees up to 15 cm (6 in) wide in less than 50 minutes. Thicker trees, at 25 cm (10 in) wide or more, may not fall for hours. When chewing down a tree, beavers switch between biting with the left and right side of the mouth. Tree branches are then cut and carried to their destination with the powerful jaw and neck muscles. Other building materials, like mud and rocks, are held by the forelimbs and tucked between the chin and chest.

Beavers start building dams when they hear running water, and the sound of a leak in a dam triggers them to repair it. To build a dam, beavers stack up relatively long and thick logs between the banks. Heavy rocks keep them stable, and grass is packed between them. Beavers continue to pile on more material until the dam slopes in a direction facing upstream. Dams can range in height from 20 cm (8 in) to 3 m (10 ft) and can stretch from 0.3 m (0.98 ft) to several hundred meters long. Beaver dams are more effective in trapping and slowly leaking water than man-made concrete dams. Lake-dwelling beavers do not need to build dams.

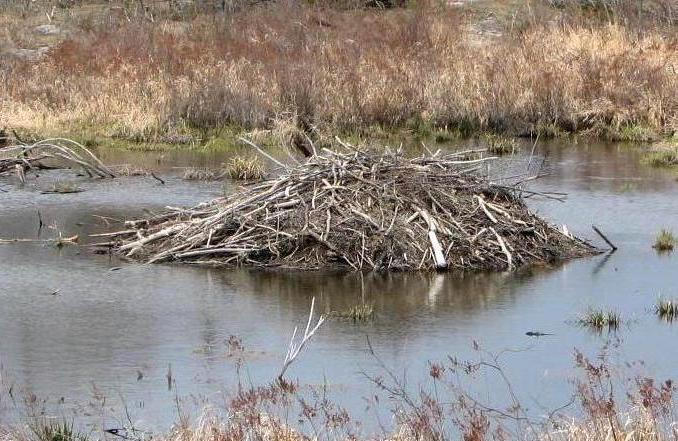
Open-water beaver lodge in Canada.

Beavers make two types of lodges: bank lodges and open-water lodges. Bank lodges are burrows dug along the shore and covered in sticks while the more complex freestanding, open-water lodges are built over a platform of piled-up sticks. The lodge is mostly sealed with mud, except for a hole at the top which acts as an air vent. Both types are accessed by underwater entrances. The above-water space inside the lodge is known as the "living chamber", and a "dining area" may exist close to the water entrance. Families routinely clean out old plant material and bring in new material.

North American beavers build more open-water lodges than Eurasian beavers. Beaver lodges built by new settlers are typically small and sloppy. More experienced families can build structures with a height of 2 m (6 ft 7 in) and an above-water diameter of 6 m (20 ft). A lodge sturdy enough to withstand the coming winter can be finished in just two nights. Both lodge types can be present at a beaver site. Beavers tend to use bank lodges to keep cool during the summer and use open-water lodges during the winter. The air vent provides ventilation, and newly added carbon dioxide can be cleared in an hour. The lodge remains consistent in oxygen and carbon dioxide levels from season to season.

Beavers in some areas will dig canals connected to their ponds. The canals fill with groundwater and give beavers access and easier transport of resources, as well as allow them to escape predators. These canals can stretch up to 1 m (3 ft 3 in) wide, 0.5 m (1 ft 8 in) deep, and over 0.5 km (0.3 mi) long. It has been hypothesized that beavers' canals are not only transportation routes but an extension of their "central place" around the lodge and/or food cache. As they drag wood across the land, beavers leave behind trails or "slides", which they reuse when moving new material.

=== Environmental effects ===
Beaver dam enlargement

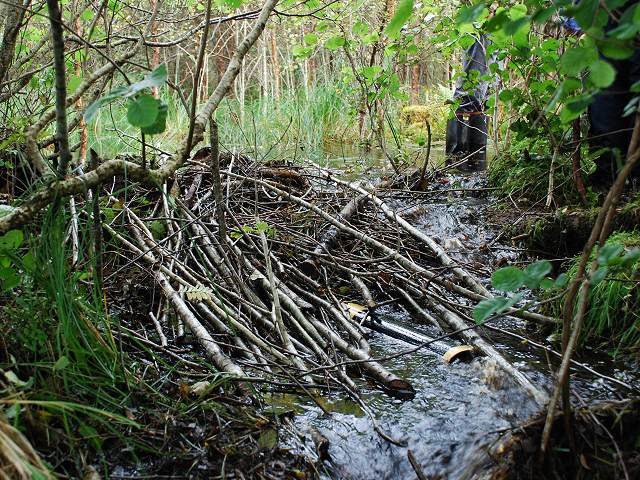
September 2009

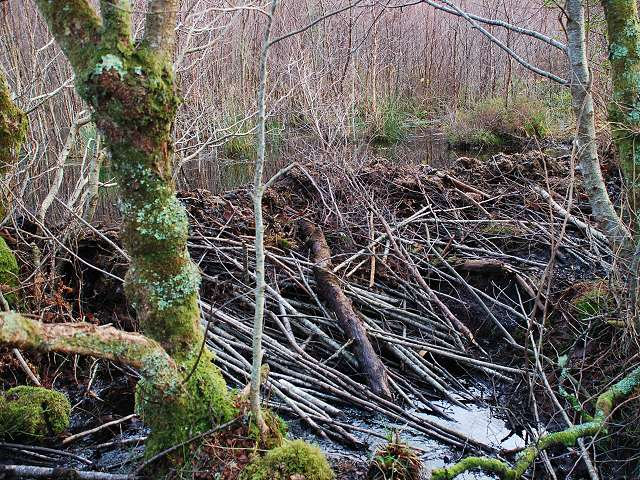
December 2009

Images of a beaver dam over a four-month period. Dams block rivers and create ponds.

The beaver works as an ecosystem engineer and keystone species, as its activities can have a great impact on the landscape and biodiversity of an area. Aside from humans, few other extant animals appear to do more to shape their environment. When building dams, beavers alter the paths of streams and rivers, allowing for the creation of extensive wetland habitats. In one study, beavers were associated with large increases in open-water areas. When beavers returned to an area, 160% more open water was available during droughts than in previous years, when they were absent. Beaver dams also lead to higher water tables in mineral soil environments and in wetlands such as peatlands. In peatlands particularly, their dams stabilize the constantly changing water levels, leading to greater carbon storage.

Beaver ponds, and the wetlands that succeed them, remove sediments and pollutants from waterways, and can stop the loss of important soils. These ponds can increase the productivity of freshwater ecosystems by accumulating nitrogen in sediments. Beaver activity can affect the temperature of the water; in northern latitudes, ice thaws earlier in the warmer beaver-dammed waters. Beavers may contribute to climate change. In Arctic areas, the floods they create can cause permafrost to thaw, releasing methane into the atmosphere.

As wetlands are formed and riparian habitats are enlarged, aquatic plants colonize the newly available watery habitat. One study in the Adirondacks found that beaver engineering led to an increase of more than 33 percent in herbaceous plant diversity along the water's edge. Another study in semiarid eastern Oregon found that the width of riparian vegetation on stream banks increased several-fold as beaver dams watered previously dry terraces adjacent to the stream. Riparian ecosystems in arid areas appear to sustain more plant life when beaver dams are present. Beaver ponds act as a refuge for riverbank plants during wildfires, and provide them with enough moisture to resist such fires. Introduced beavers at Tierra del Fuego have been responsible for destroying the indigenous forest. Unlike trees in North America, many trees in South America cannot grow back after being cut down.

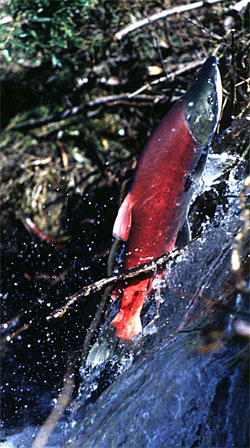
Salmon (Oncorhynchus nerka) jumping a beaver dam.

Beaver activity impacts communities of aquatic invertebrates. Damming typically leads to an increase of slow or motionless water species, like dragonflies, oligochaetes, snails, and mussels. This is to the detriment of rapid water species like black flies, stoneflies, and net-spinning caddisflies. Beaver floodings create more dead trees, providing more habitat for terrestrial invertebrates like Drosophila flies and bark beetles, which live and breed in dead wood. The presence of beavers can increase wild salmon and trout populations, and the average size of these fishes. These species use beaver habitats for spawning, overwintering, feeding, and as havens from changes in water flow. The positive effects of beaver dams on fish appear to outweigh the negative effects, such as blocking of migration. Beaver ponds have been shown to be beneficial to frog populations by protecting areas for larvae to mature in warm water. The stable waters of beaver ponds also provide ideal habitat for freshwater turtles.

Beavers help waterfowl by creating increased areas of water. The widening of the riparian zone associated with beaver dams has been shown to increase the abundance and diversity of birds favoring the water's edge, an impact that may be especially important in semi-arid climates. Fish-eating birds use beaver ponds for foraging, and in some areas, certain species appear more frequently at sites where beavers were active than at sites with no beaver activity. In a study of Wyoming streams and rivers, watercourses with beavers had 75 times as many ducks as those without. As trees are drowned by rising beaver impoundments, they become an ideal habitat for woodpeckers, which carve cavities that may be later used by other bird species. Beaver-caused ice thawing in northern latitudes allows Canada geese to nest earlier.

Other semi-aquatic mammals, such as water voles, muskrats, minks, and otters, will shelter in beaver lodges. Beaver modifications to streams in Poland create habitats favorable to bat species that forage at the water surface and "prefer moderate vegetation clutter". Large herbivores, such as some deer species, benefit from beaver activity as they can access vegetation from fallen trees and ponds.

=== Mortality and health ===
Beavers usually live up to 10 years. Felids, canids, and bears may prey upon them. Beavers are protected from predators when in their lodges, and prefer to stay near water. Parasites of the beaver include the bacterium Francisella tularensis, which causes tularemia; the protozoan Giardia duodenalis, which causes giardiasis (beaver fever); and the beaver beetle and mites of the genus Schizocarpus. They have also been recorded to be infected with the rabies virus.

== Behavior ==
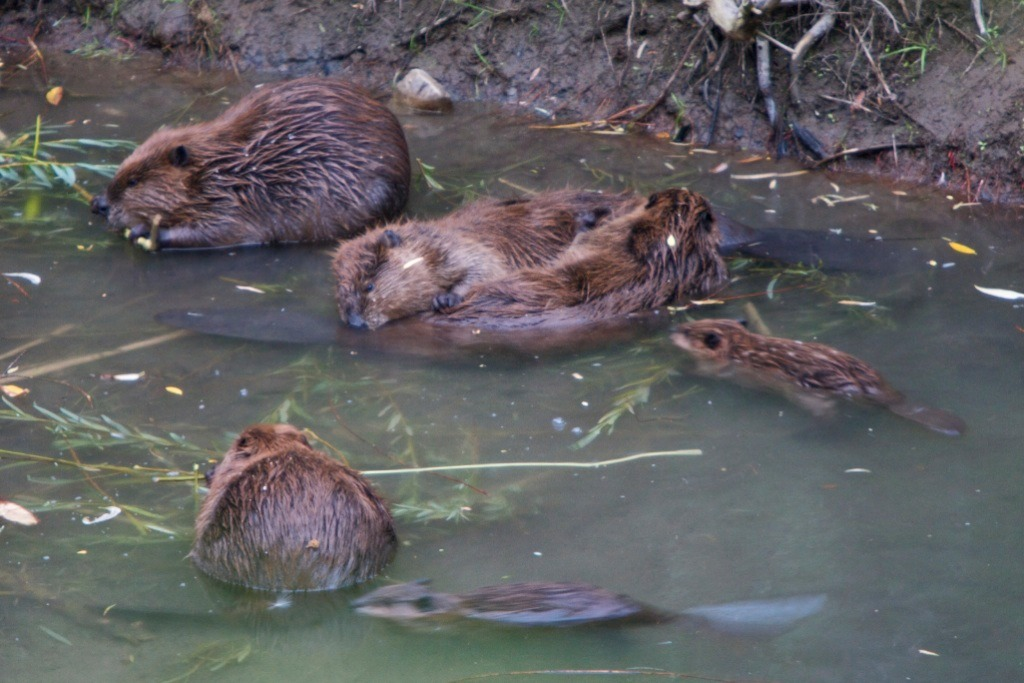
North American beaver family, with the center pair grooming one another.

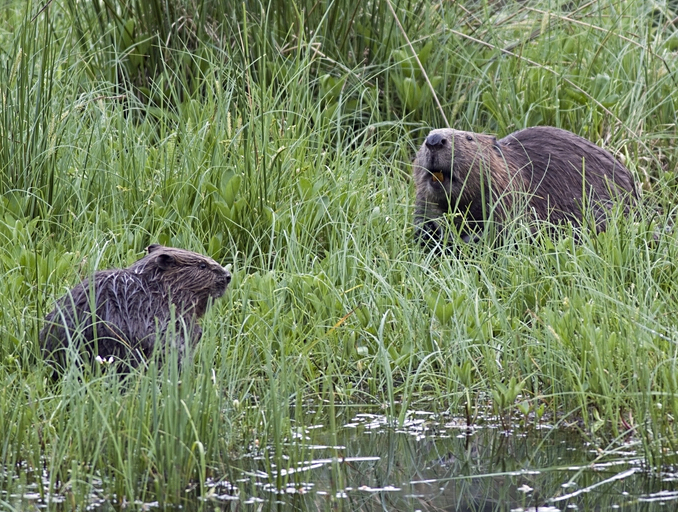
Eurasian beaver parent and kit.

Beavers are mainly nocturnal and crepuscular, and spend the daytime in their shelters. In northern latitudes, beaver activity is decoupled from the 24-hour cycle during the winter, and may last as long as 29 hours. They do not hibernate during winter, and spend much of their time in their lodges.

=== Family life ===
The core of beaver social organization is the family, which is composed of an adult male and an adult female in a monogamous pair and their offspring. Beaver families can have as many as ten members; groups about this size require multiple lodges. Mutual grooming and play fighting maintain bonds between family members, and aggression between them is uncommon.

Adult beavers mate with their partners, though partner replacement appears to be common. A beaver that loses its partner will wait for another one to come by. Estrus cycles begin in late December and peak in mid-January. Females may have two to four estrus cycles per season, each lasting 12–24 hours. The pair typically mate in the water and to a lesser extent in the lodge, for half a minute to three minutes.

Up to four young, or kits, are born in spring and summer, after a three or four-month gestation. Newborn beavers are precocial with a full fur coat, and can open their eyes within days of birth. Their mother is the primary caretaker, while their father maintains the territory. Older siblings from a previous litter also play a role.

After they are born, the kits spend their first one to two months in the lodge. Kits suckle for as long as three months, but can eat solid food within their second week and rely on their parents and older siblings to bring it to them. Eventually, beaver kits explore outside the lodge and forage on their own, but may follow an older relative and hold onto their backs. After their first year, young beavers help their families with construction. Beavers sexually mature around the ages of 1.5–3 years. They become independent at two years old, but remain with their parents for an extra year or more during times of food shortage, high population density, or drought.

=== Territories and spacing ===
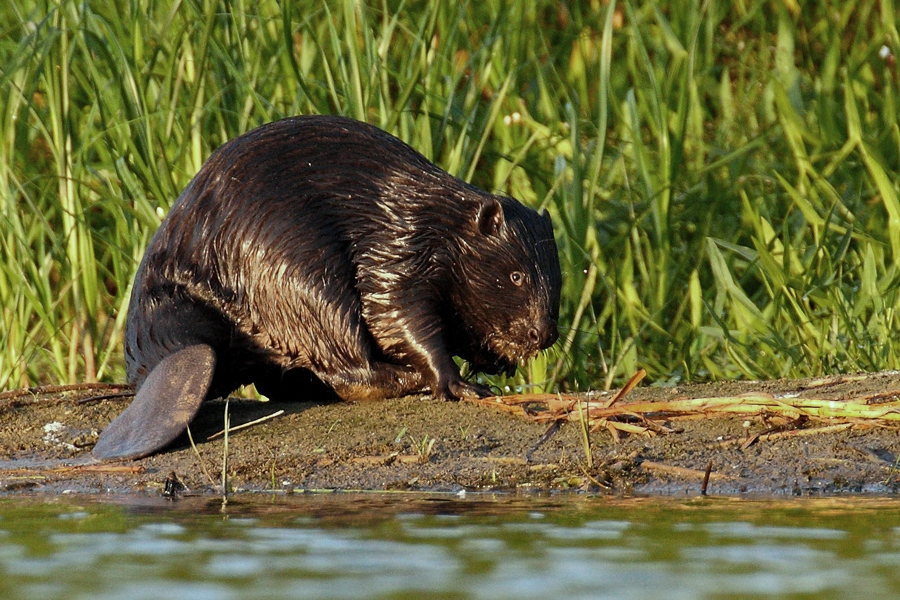
Eurasian beaver near its dam.

Beavers typically disperse from their parental colonies during the spring or when the winter snow melts. They often travel less than 5 km (3 mi), but long-distance dispersals are not uncommon when previous colonizers have already exploited local resources. Beavers are able to travel greater distances when free-flowing water is available. Individuals may meet their mates during the dispersal stage, and the pair travel together. It may take them weeks or months to reach their final destination; longer distances may require several years. Beavers establish and defend territories along the banks of their ponds, which may be 1–7 km (0.6–4.3 mi) in length.

Beavers mark their territories by constructing scent mounds made of mud and vegetation, scented with castoreum. Those with many territorial neighbors create more scent mounds. Scent marking increases in spring, during the dispersal of yearlings, to deter interlopers. Beavers are generally intolerant of intruders and fights may result in deep bites to the sides, rump, and tail. They exhibit a behavior known as the "dear enemy effect"; a territory-holder will investigate and become familiar with the scents of its neighbors and react more aggressively to the scents of strangers passing by. Beavers are also more tolerant of individuals that are their kin. They recognize them by using their keen sense of smell to detect differences in the composition of anal gland secretions. Anal gland secretion profiles are more similar among relatives than unrelated individuals.

=== Communication ===
Beavers within a family greet each other with whines. Kits will attract the attention of adults with mews, squeaks, and cries. Defensive beavers produce a hissing growl and gnash their teeth. Tail slaps, which involve a beaver hitting the water surface with its tail, serve as alarm signals warning other beavers of a potential threat. An adult's tail slap is more successful in alerting others, who will escape into the lodge or deeper water. Juveniles have not yet learned the proper use of a tail slap, and hence are normally ignored. Eurasian beavers have been recorded using a territorial "stick display", which involves individuals holding up a stick and bouncing in shallow water.

== Interactions with humans ==
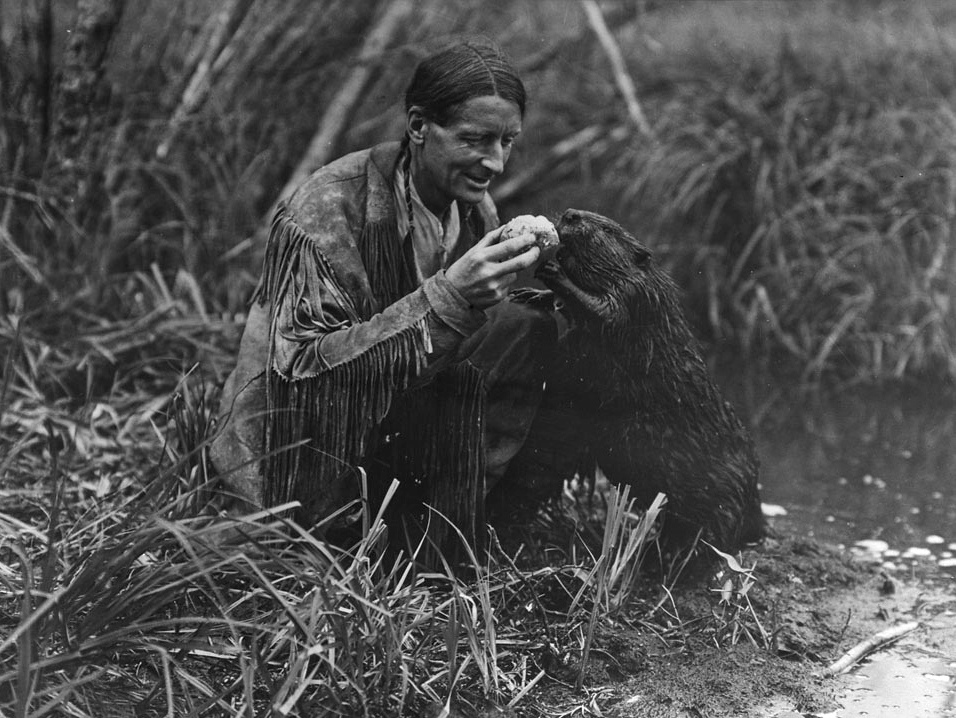
Grey Owl feeding his beaver.

Beavers sometimes come into conflict with humans over land use; individual beavers may be labeled as "nuisance beavers". Beavers can damage crops, timber stocks, roads, ditches, gardens, and pastures via gnawing, eating, digging, and flooding. They occasionally attack humans and domestic pets, particularly when infected with rabies, in defense of their territory, or when they feel threatened. Some of these attacks have been fatal, including at least one human death. Beavers can spread giardiasis ('beaver fever') by infecting surface waters, though outbreaks are more commonly caused by human activity.

Flow devices, like beaver pipes, are used to manage beaver flooding, while fencing and hardware cloth protect trees and shrubs from beaver damage. If necessary, hand tools, heavy equipment, or explosives are used to remove dams. Hunting, trapping, and relocation may be permitted as forms of population control and for removal of individuals. The governments of Argentina and Chile have authorized the trapping of invasive beavers in hopes of eliminating them. The ecological importance of beavers has led to cities like Seattle designing their parks and green spaces to accommodate the animals. The Martinez beavers became famous in the mid-2000s for their role in improving the ecosystem of Alhambra Creek in Martinez, California.

Zoos have displayed beavers since at least the 19th century, though not commonly. In captivity, beavers have been used for entertainment, fur harvesting, and for reintroduction into the wild. Captive beavers require access to water, substrate for digging, and artificial shelters. Archibald Stansfeld "Grey Owl" Belaney pioneered beaver conservation in the early 20th century. Belaney wrote several books, and was first to professionally film beavers in their environment. In 1931, he moved to a log cabin in Prince Albert National Park, where he was the "caretaker of park animals" and raised a beaver pair and their four offspring. Dorothy Burney Richards, inspired by Belaney, lived with beavers in her home at Beaversprite.

=== Commercial use ===
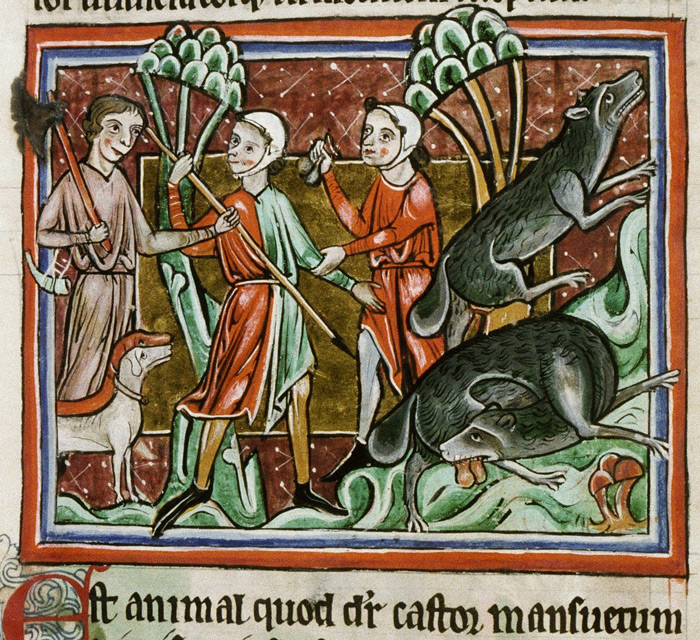
Depiction of a beaver hunt from a medieval bestiary with the beaver depicted as biting off its testicles.

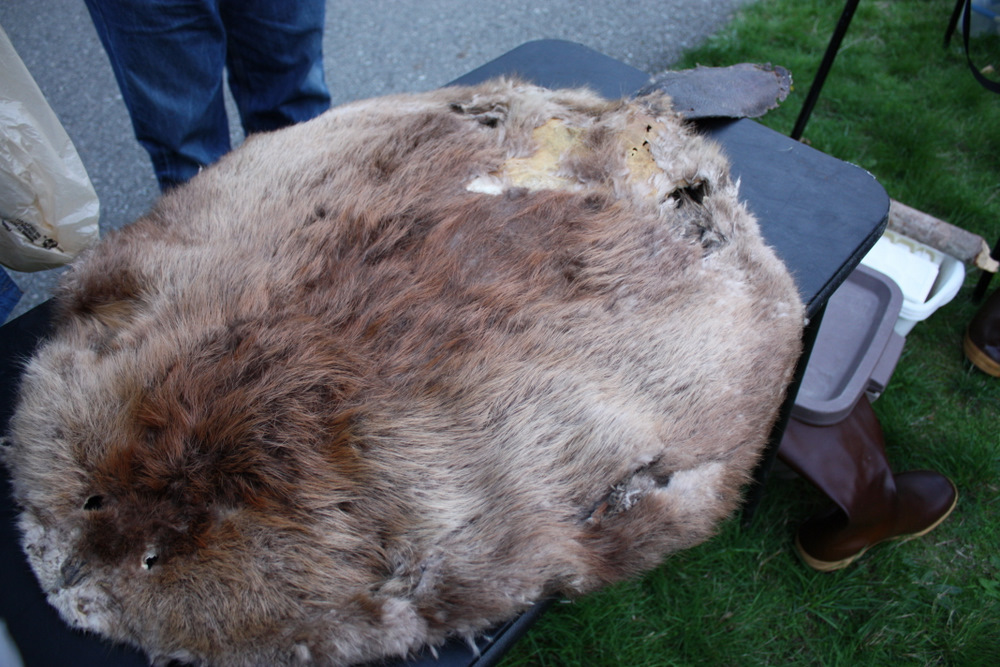
Beaver pelts were the driving force of the North American fur trade.

Beavers have been hunted, trapped, and exploited for their fur, meat, and castoreum. Since the animals typically stayed in one place, trappers could easily find them and could kill entire families in a lodge. Many pre-modern people mistakenly thought that castoreum was produced by the testicles or that the castor sacs of the beaver were its testicles, and females were hermaphrodites. Aesop's Fables describes beavers chewing off their testicles to preserve themselves from hunters, which is impossible because a beaver's testicles are internal. This myth persisted for centuries, and was corrected by French physician Guillaume Rondelet in the 1500s. Beavers have historically been hunted and captured using deadfalls, snares, nets, bows and arrows, spears, clubs, firearms, and leg-hold traps. Castoreum was used to lure the animals.

Castoreum was used for a variety of medical purposes; Pliny the Elder promoted it as a treatment for stomach problems, flatulence, seizures, sciatica, vertigo, and epilepsy. He stated it could stop hiccups when mixed with vinegar, toothaches if mixed with oil (by administering into the ear opening on the same side as the tooth), and could be used as an antivenom. The substance has traditionally been prescribed to treat hysteria in women, which was believed to have been caused by a "toxic" womb. Castoreum's properties have been credited to the accumulation of salicylic acid from willow and aspen trees in the beaver's diet, and has a physiological effect comparable to aspirin. Today, the medical use of castoreum has declined and is limited mainly to homeopathy. The substance is also used as an ingredient in perfumes and tinctures, and as a flavouring in food and drinks.

Various Native American groups have historically hunted beavers for food, they preferred its meat more than other red meats because of its higher calorie and fat content, and the animals remained plump in winter when they were most hunted. The bones were used to make tools. In medieval Europe, the Catholic Church considered the beaver to be part mammal and part fish, and allowed followers to eat the scaly, fishlike tail on meatless Fridays during Lent. Beaver tails were thus highly prized in Europe; they were described by French naturalist Pierre Belon as tasting like a "nicely dressed eel".

Beaver pelts were used to make hats; felters would remove the guard hairs. The number of pelts needed depended on the type of hat, with Cavalier and Puritan hats requiring more fur than top hats. In the late 16th century, Europeans began to deal in North American furs due to the lack of taxes or tariffs on the continent and the decline of fur-bearers at home. Beaver pelts caused or contributed to the Beaver Wars, King William's War, and the French and Indian War; the trade made John Jacob Astor and the owners of the North West Company very wealthy. For Europeans in North America, the fur trade was a driver of the exploration and westward exploration on the continent and contact with native peoples, who traded with them. The fur trade peaked between 1860 and 1870, when over 150,000 beaver pelts were purchased annually by the Hudson's Bay Company and fur companies in the United States. The contemporary global fur trade is not as profitable due to conservation, and anti-fur and animal rights campaigns.

=== In culture ===
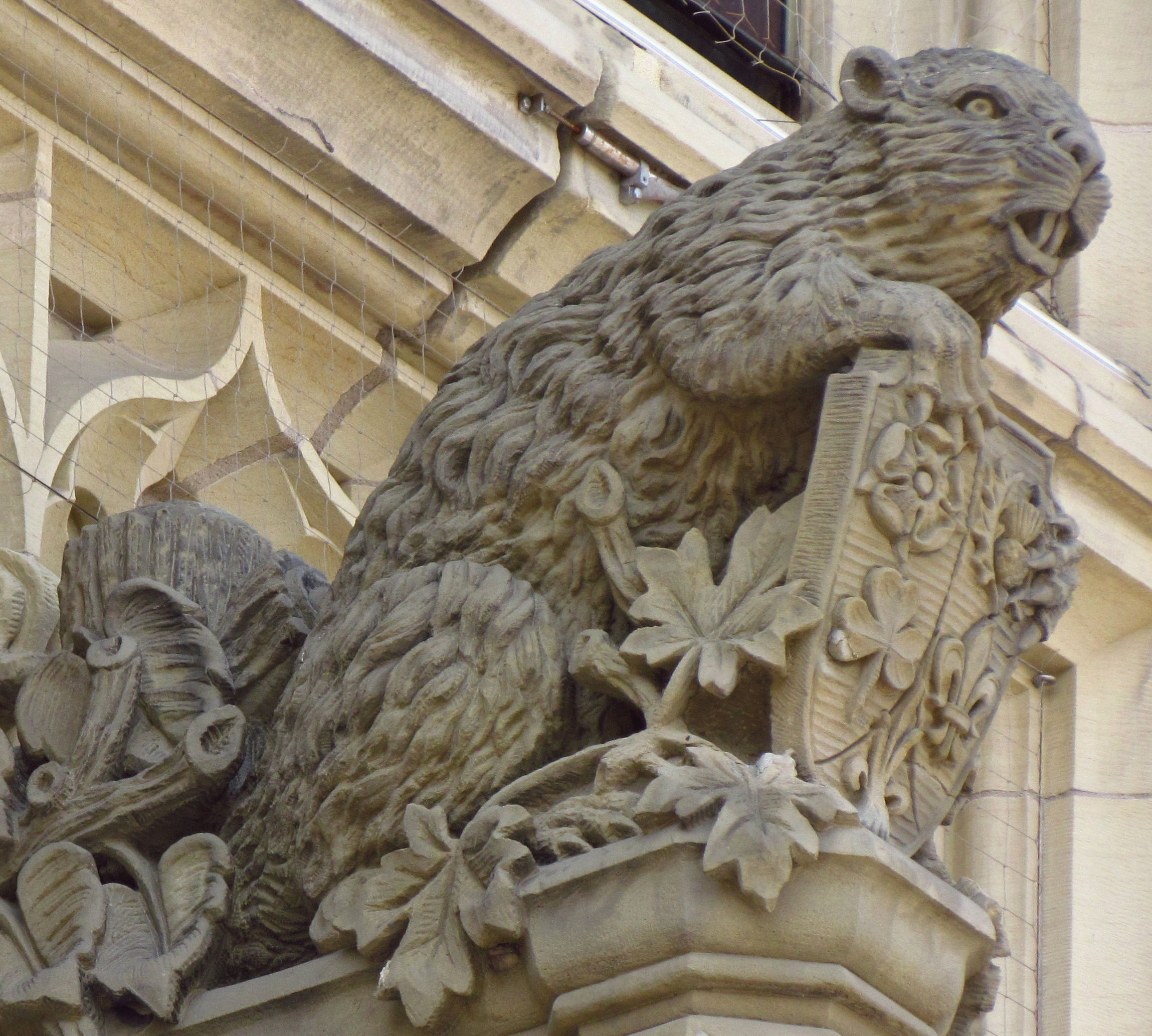
Beaver sculpture over entrance to the Canadian Parliament Building.

The beaver has been used to represent productivity, trade, tradition, masculinity, and respectability. References to the beaver's skills are reflected in everyday language. The English verb "to beaver" means working with great effort and being "as busy as a beaver"; a "beaver intellect" refers to a way of thinking that is slow and honest. Though it typically has a wholesome image, the beaver's name has been used as a sexual term for the human vulva.

Native American myths emphasize the beaver's skill and industriousness. In the mythology of the Haida, beavers are descended from the Beaver-Woman, who built a dam on a stream next to their cabin while her husband was out hunting and gave birth to the first beavers. In a Cree story, the Great Beaver and its dam caused a world flood. Other tales involve beavers using their tree chewing skills against an enemy. Beavers have been featured as companions in some stories, including a Lakota tale where a young woman flees from her evil husband with the aid of her pet beaver.

Europeans have traditionally thought of beavers as fantastical animals due to their amphibious nature. They depicted them with exaggerated tusk-like teeth, dog- or pig-like bodies, fish tails, and visible testicles. French cartographer Nicolas de Fer illustrated beavers building a dam at Niagara Falls, fantastically depicting them like human builders. Beavers have also appeared in literature such as Dante Alighieri's Divine Comedy and the writings of Athanasius Kircher, who wrote that on Noah's Ark the beavers were housed near a water-filled tub that was also used by mermaids and otters.

The beaver has long been associated with Canada, appearing on the first pictorial postage stamp issued in the Canadian colonies in 1851 as the so-called "Three-Penny Beaver". It was declared the national animal in 1975. The five-cent coin, the coat of arms of the Hudson's Bay Company, and the logos for Parks Canada and Roots Canada use its image. Frank and Gordon are two fictional beavers that appeared in Bell Canada's advertisements between 2005 and 2008. However, the beaver's status as a rodent has made it controversial, and it was not chosen to be on the Arms of Canada in 1921. The beaver has commonly been used to represent Canada in political cartoons, typically to signify it as a friendly but relatively weak nation.

== See also ==
- Beaver drop
