= Bouber =

Bouber is a surname. Notable people with the surname include:

- Aaf Bouber (1885–1974), Dutch actress
- Herman Bouber (1885–1963), Dutch actor, screenwriter, and playwright

== See also ==
- Bober (surname)
