= Bober (disambiguation) =

Bober may refer to:

- German name of Bóbr river
- Bober (surname)
- Johann von Böber (1746-1820), German teacher, entomologist and botanist
- Bober (drone), a Ukrainian long-range loitering munition

== See also ==
- Bobr (disambiguation)
