= Bóbr (surname) =

Bóbr or Bobr is a surname literally meaning "beaver" in Polish and Russian languages. Notable people with this surname include:

- Kamila Bobr (born 1997), Belarusian sprint canoeist.
- Stanisław Bóbr-Tylingo (1919–2001), Polish-born historian and Polish resistance fighter
- Irena Bóbr-Modrakowa (1889–1959), Polish physicist and seismologist

== See also ==
- Bober (surname)
