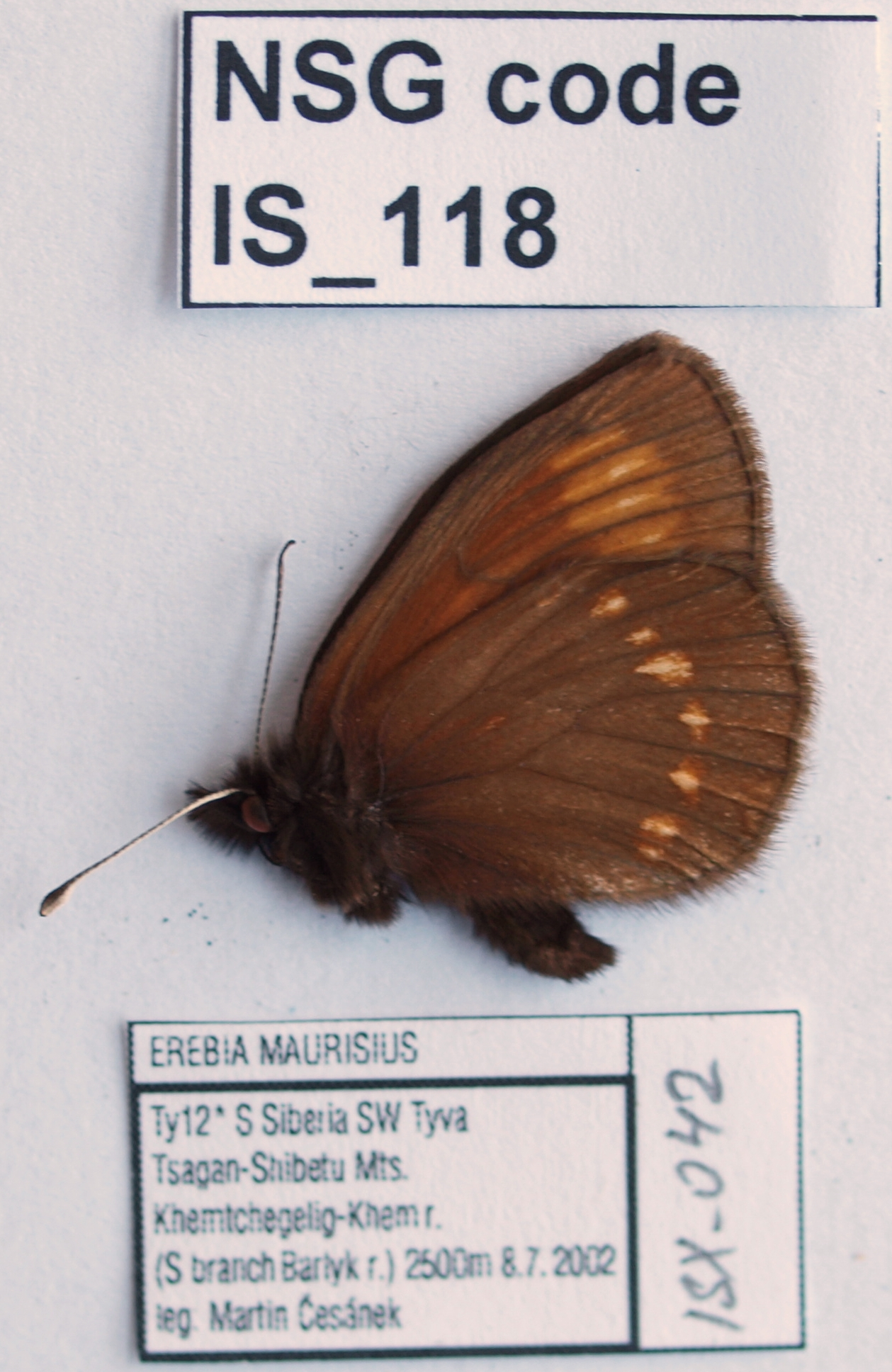

Scientific classification
- Kingdom: Animalia
- Phylum: Arthropoda
- Class: Insecta
- Order: Lepidoptera
- Family: Nymphalidae
- Genus: Erebia
- Species: E. brimo

Binomial name
- Erebia brimo (Bober, 1809)

= Erebia brimo =

Species of butterfly

Erebia brimo is a species of butterfly in the subfamily Satyrinae of the family Nymphalidae. It is found in the east Palearctic (Kazakhstan, Siberia, Mongolia) The name may refer to Erebia maurisius.
