= Leptinillus validus =

Scientific classification
- Domain: Eukaryota
- Kingdom: Animalia
- Phylum: Arthropoda
- Class: Insecta
- Order: Coleoptera
- Suborder: Polyphaga
- Infraorder: Staphyliniformia
- Family: Leiodidae
- Subfamily: Platypsyllinae
- Genus: Leptinillus
- Species: L. validus

Binomial name
- Leptinillus validus (Horn, 1872)

Species of beetle

Leptinillus validus, the beaver nest beetle, is a species of round fungus beetle in the family Leiodidae. It is found in North America.
