= Bobr =

Bobr may refer to:

- Eurasian Beaver
- Bobr (Berezina), a river in Belarus, tributary of the Berezina
- Bóbr, a river in the Czech Republic and the southwest of Poland, tributary of the Oder
- Bobr Air Base in Belarus
- Bobr (urban-type settlement), an urban-type settlement in Belarus
- AMZ Bóbr-3, Polish armored reconnaissance vehicle
- ORP Bóbr (pl), a Polish minesweeper, built in 1958
- Russian gunboat Bobr (1884) (ru)
- Russian gunboat Bobr (1906) (ru), later in Estonian navy as EML Lembit (1918}
- Bóbr (surname)

== See also ==
- Bober (disambiguation)
