= Bibra =

Bibra may refer to:

== Organisations ==
- British Industrial Biological Research Association, now known as BIBRA in the UK

== Places ==
- Bibra, Schmalkalden-Meiningen, a village in the district Schmalkalden-Meiningen, Thuringia, Germany
- Bibra, Saale-Holzland, a municipality in the Saale-Holzland-Kreis in Thuringia, Germany
- Bad Bibra, a town in Burgenlandkreis, Saxony-Anhalt, Germany
- Bibra, Andhra Pradesh, a town near Sirpur (T), in the state of Andhra Pradesh, India
- Bibra Roman Fort, a Roman fort near Beckfoot, Cumbria, U.K.
- Bibra Lake, Western Australia, a suburb of Perth, Western Australia named after Bibra Lake within its borders
- Bibra Valley, an ice-free valley in Antarctica

== Bodies of Water ==
- Bibra (river), a small river in southern Thuringia, Germany
- Bibra Lake, a lake within the town of Bibra Lake, Western Australia

== School ==
- Heinrich-von-Bibra-Schule, a public school in Fulda, Germany

== Noble Families ==
- von Bibra: a German Franconian and Thuringian family
  - August von Bibra (1808–1894) general manager of the Verein zum Schutze Deutscher Einwanderer in Texas
  - Conrad von Bibra (1490–1544), Prince-Bishop of Würzburg
  - Ernst von Bibra (1806–1878), Naturalist and Author
  - Eve von Bibra, actress and singer in Australia
  - Franz Ludwig von Bibra (1783 – 1823), soldier, author, and early settler of Tasmania, Australia
  - Heinrich von Bibra (1711–1788), Prince-Bishop and Abbot of Fulda
  - Lorenz von Bibra (1456–1519), Prince-Bishop of Würzburg
  - Nikolaus von Bibra, 13th century Erfurt monk
  - Wilhelm von Bibra (1442–1490), Papal Emissary
- von Bibra(n)-Modlau family (as in Friedrich Heinrich von Bibran-Modlau of Silesia) sometimes referred to as von Bibra. Raised to Reichsfreiherr (Imperial barons) 1624. The three sons-in-law of the apparent last male Bibran-Modlau (David Heinrich), adopted the names: 1) Block von Bibran und Modlau 2) Kölichen gen. Freiherren von Bibra u. Modlau and 3) Schönberg von Bibra und Modlau. One of the three sons-in-law (Ernst Heinrich v. Kölichen,) adopted the name and coat of arms (c. 1828) but died without sons in 1832 (see Senden-Bibran below).
- von Senden-Bibran family (as in Gustav von Senden-Bibran) - Ludwig Freiherr von Senden adopted Bibran name after marrying the daughter (Agnes) of the eldest daughter of the apparent last von Bibran-Modlau c. 1836.
