= Biberbach =

Biberbach may refer to:

- Biberbach, Bavaria, a municipality in the district of Augsburg in Bavaria in Germany
- Biberbach, Austria, a village in the district of Amstetten in Lower Austria
- Biberbach (Danube), a river in Baden-Württemberg, Germany, tributary of the Danube
- Biberbach (Main), a river of Bavaria, Germany, tributary of the Mühlbach, a branch of the Main
