= Castor californicus =

Castor californicus Temporal range: late Miocene to early Pleistocene

Scientific classification
- Kingdom: Animalia
- Phylum: Chordata
- Class: Mammalia
- Order: Rodentia
- Family: Castoridae
- Genus: Castor
- Species: †C. californicus

Binomial name
- †Castor californicus Kellogg, 1911
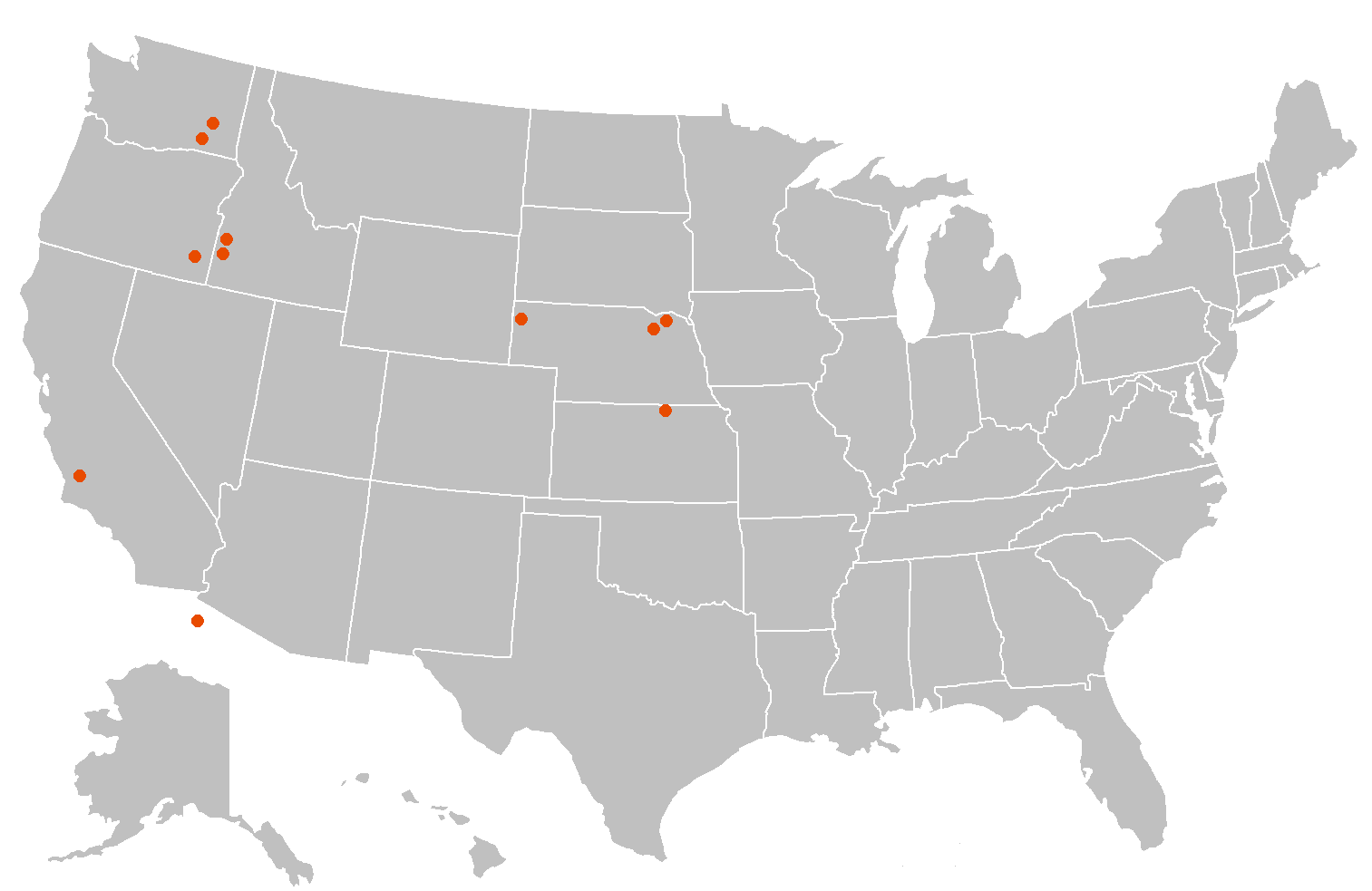
- Sites of C. californicus finds

Synonyms
- †Castor accessor Hay, 1927

Extinct species of beaver (fossil)

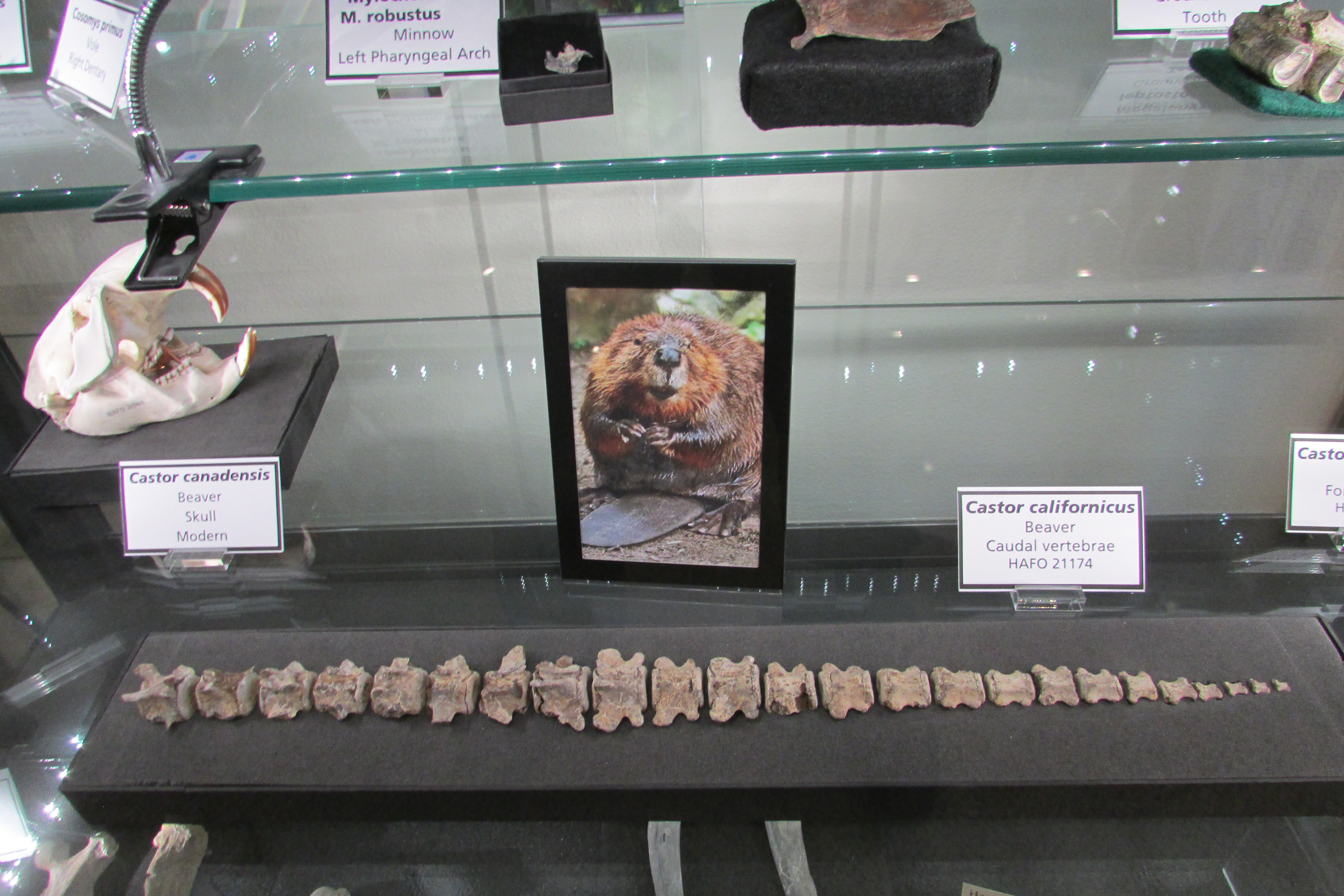
Beaver, Castor californicus

The Californian Beaver (Castor californicus) is an extinct species of beaver that lived in western North America from the end of the Miocene to the early Pleistocene. Castor californicus was first discovered in the Kettleman Hills of California, United States. The species was similar to but larger than the extant North American beaver, C. canadensis.

Unlike other members of the Castor genus, Castor californicus possessed a total of three enamel folds, the folds of the internal enamel epithelium.

== Phylogenetic characteristics ==
Castor californicus has been determined to be the earliest type of its genus to appear in North America.

Castor californicus is characterized by having short nasal passages. The backs of their skulls were quite wide in comparison to other members of the Castor genus. The coronoid process is more spread out. Their pterygoid muscles were on the larger side, and their neck muscles were broad. Due to these distinctions, Castor californicus had a slight physical advantage compared to Castor fiber, the extant European beaver. Each Castor californicus specimen examined was slightly unique in its postcranial morphology. They had short femurs and elongated hind feet, which assisted them in moving with ease through water.

Compared to other species of beavers, Castor californicus had considerably wide metatarsals, which aided them in the swimming and digging process. Castor californicus has three folds of the internal enamel epithelium, unlike other members of the Castor genus.
