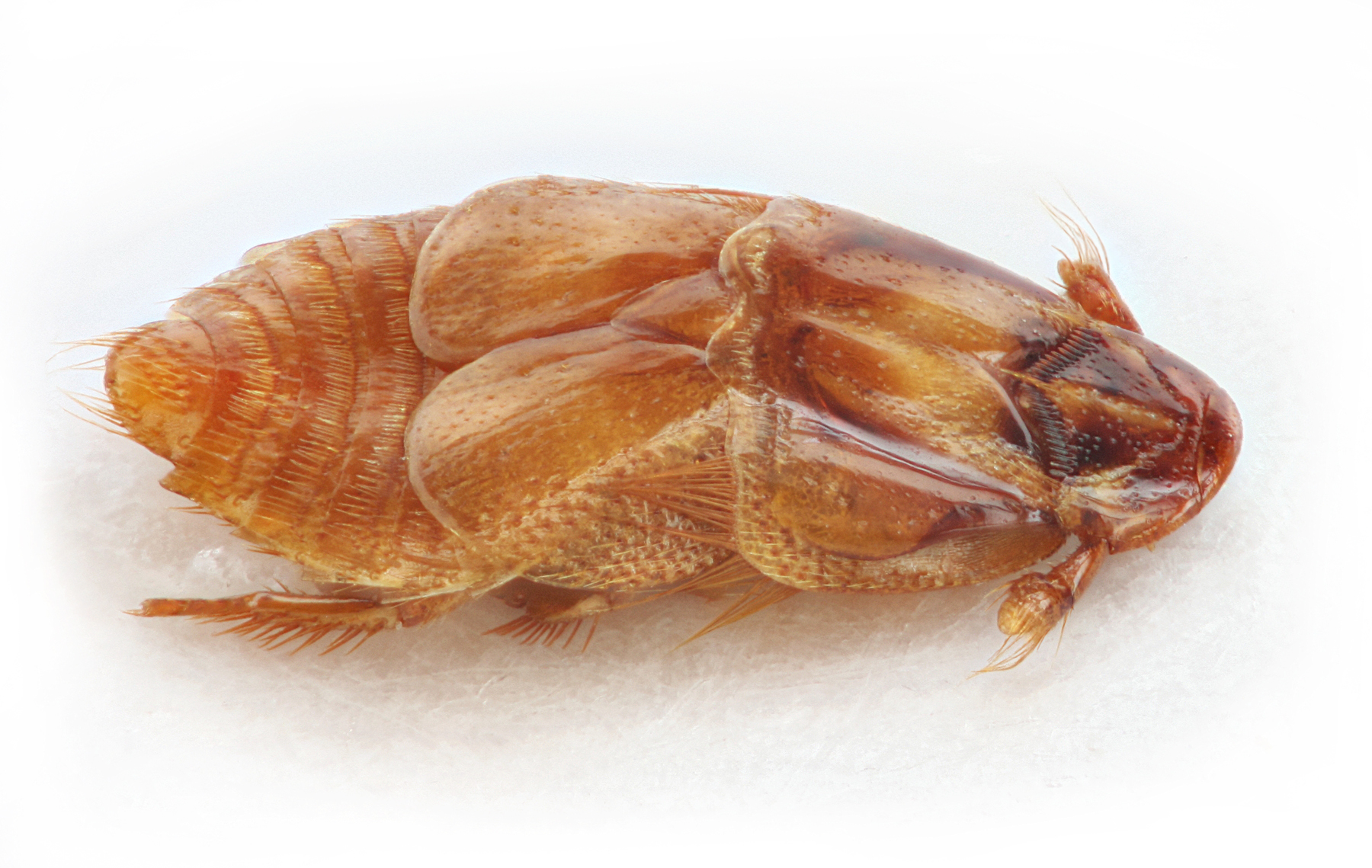

Scientific classification
- Domain: Eukaryota
- Kingdom: Animalia
- Phylum: Arthropoda
- Class: Insecta
- Order: Coleoptera
- Suborder: Polyphaga
- Infraorder: Staphyliniformia
- Superfamily: Staphylinoidea
- Family: Leiodidae
- Subfamily: Platypsyllinae
- Genus: Platypsyllus; Ritsema, 1869
- Species: P. castoris

Binomial name
- Platypsyllus castoris Ritsema, 1869

Synonyms
- Platypsyllus castorinus Westwood, 1869

= Beaver beetle =

Species of beetle

The beaver beetle (Platypsyllus castoris) is an ectoparasitic beetle that is only found on its host species, beavers, and the sole member of the genus Platypsyllus. It is flattened and eyeless, resembling a flea or tick. It used to be placed in a separate family called Leptinidae, but is now placed in the family Leiodidae, in the subfamily Platypsyllinae.

== Description ==
The beaver beetle has various modifications to suit its ectoparasitic mode of life. It resembles a flea or a louse in appearance and the family Platypsyllidae was originally placed in the flea order Siphonaptera, and one taxonomist treated it as a unique example of a new order of insects. It has no wings and no eyes, and its antennal clubs have the antennomeres numbered 3 to 11 shortened, compacted globularly, and partly enclosed in a scoop-shaped antennomere. The larvae are also ectoparasitic on beavers and have hooks on the three thoracic segments which enable it to cling to its host.

== Distribution ==
The beetle exists only in the northern hemisphere (holarctic) and is restricted to areas in which beavers are found, North America and northern Europe and Asia.

== Behaviour ==
Besides the North American beaver (Castor canadensis) and the Eurasian beaver (Castor fiber), the only other host on which this beetle has been found is the North American river otter (Lontra canadensis), and this was only on one occasion. It is hypothesized that the otter may have picked up the parasite when it entered a beaver lodge or perhaps killed a young beaver, a thing that otters are believed to do on occasion. Both adult beetles and larvae feed on epidermal tissue, and also perhaps on skin secretions and liquids oozing from wounds. It is possible that the larvae may also act as scavengers in the beaver lodge.
