= Leptinillus =

Scientific classification
- Domain: Eukaryota
- Kingdom: Animalia
- Phylum: Arthropoda
- Class: Insecta
- Order: Coleoptera
- Suborder: Polyphaga
- Infraorder: Staphyliniformia
- Family: Leiodidae
- Subfamily: Platypsyllinae
- Genus: Leptinillus; Horn, 1882

Genus of beetles

Leptinillus is a genus of mammal-nest beetles in the family Leiodidae. There are at least 2 described species in Leptinillus.

== Species ==
- Leptinillus aplodontiae Ferris, 1918
- Leptinillus validus (Horn, 1872) (beaver nest beetle)
