= Leptinus orientamericanus =

Scientific classification
- Domain: Eukaryota
- Kingdom: Animalia
- Phylum: Arthropoda
- Class: Insecta
- Order: Coleoptera
- Suborder: Polyphaga
- Infraorder: Staphyliniformia
- Family: Leiodidae
- Genus: Leptinus
- Species: L. orientamericanus

Binomial name
- Leptinus orientamericanus Peck, 1982

Species of beetle

Leptinus orientamericanus is a species of round fungus beetle in the Leiodidae family. It is found in North America.
