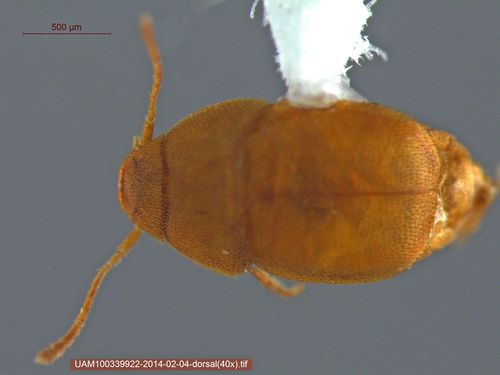

Scientific classification
- Domain: Eukaryota
- Kingdom: Animalia
- Phylum: Arthropoda
- Class: Insecta
- Order: Coleoptera
- Suborder: Polyphaga
- Infraorder: Staphyliniformia
- Family: Leiodidae
- Genus: Leptinus
- Species: L. occidentamericanus

Binomial name
- Leptinus occidentamericanus Peck, 1982

= Leptinus occidentamericanus =

Species of beetle

Leptinus occidentamericanus is a species of round fungus beetle in the family Leiodidae. It is found in North America.
