= Jüchse =

Location
- Country: Germany
- States: Thuringia

Physical characteristics
- Mouth
  - location: Werra
  - coordinates: 50.5278°N 10.4371°E

Basin features
- Progression: Werra→ Weser→ North Sea
- Tributaries
  - left: Bibra

Jüchse is a river of Thuringia, Germany. It flows into the Werra in Obermaßfeld-Grimmenthal.

== See also ==
- List of rivers of Thuringia
