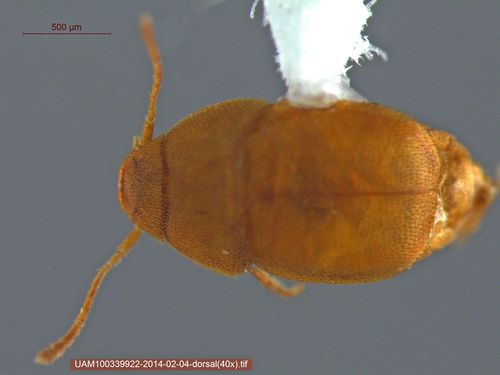
- Leptinus occidentamericanus

Scientific classification
- Kingdom: Animalia
- Phylum: Arthropoda
- Class: Insecta
- Order: Coleoptera
- Suborder: Polyphaga
- Infraorder: Staphyliniformia
- Family: Leiodidae
- Subfamily: Platypsyllinae
- Genus: Leptinus; Müller, 1817

= Leptinus =

Genus of beetles

Leptinus is a genus of mammal-nest beetles in the family Leiodidae, sometimes referred to as "mouse nest beetles". There are at least 3 described species in Leptinus.

== Species ==
- Leptinus americanus LeConte, 1866
- Leptinus occidentamericanus Peck, 1982
- Leptinus orientamericanus Peck, 1982
