= Bibra (river) =

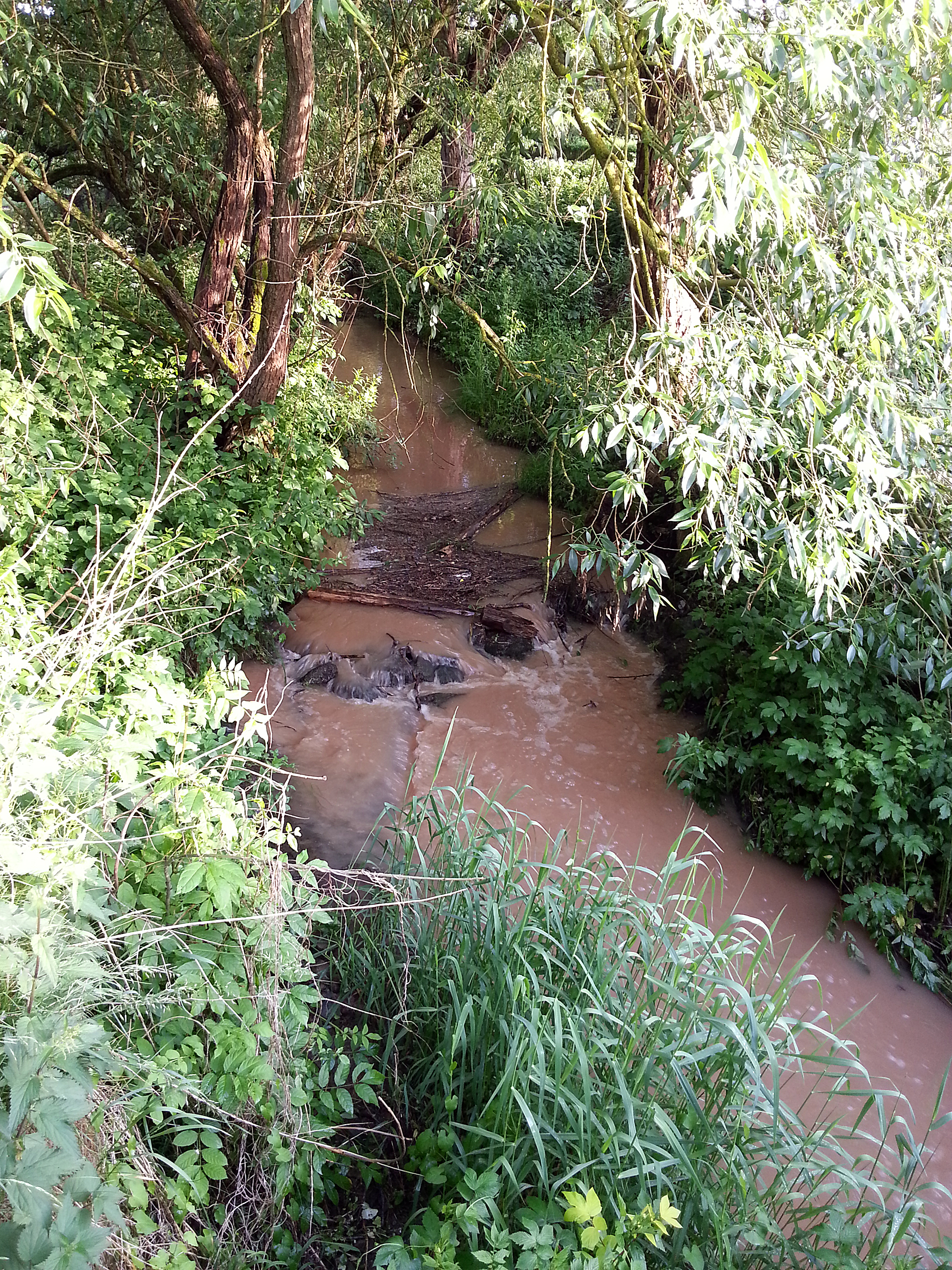

Location
- Country: Germany
- State: Thuringia

Physical characteristics
- Mouth
  - location: Jüchse
  - coordinates: 50.5067°N 10.4462°E

Basin features
- Progression: Jüchse→ Werra→ Weser→ North Sea

Bibra (German pronunciation: [ˈbiːbʁa]) a small river in southern Thuringia, Germany. It is a tributary of the Jüchse which is in turn a tributary of the Werra. It flows through the village Bibra.

== See also ==
- List of rivers of Thuringia
