= Biebrich =

Biebrich may refer to:

- Biebrich (Wiesbaden), a borough of Wiesbaden, Hesse, Germany, until 1926 an independent town
  - Biebrich Palace, Wiesbaden
- Biebrich, Rhineland Palatinate, a small municipality in the Rhein-Lahn district, Rhineland-Palatinate, Germany
