= Biberbach (Main) =

River in Germany

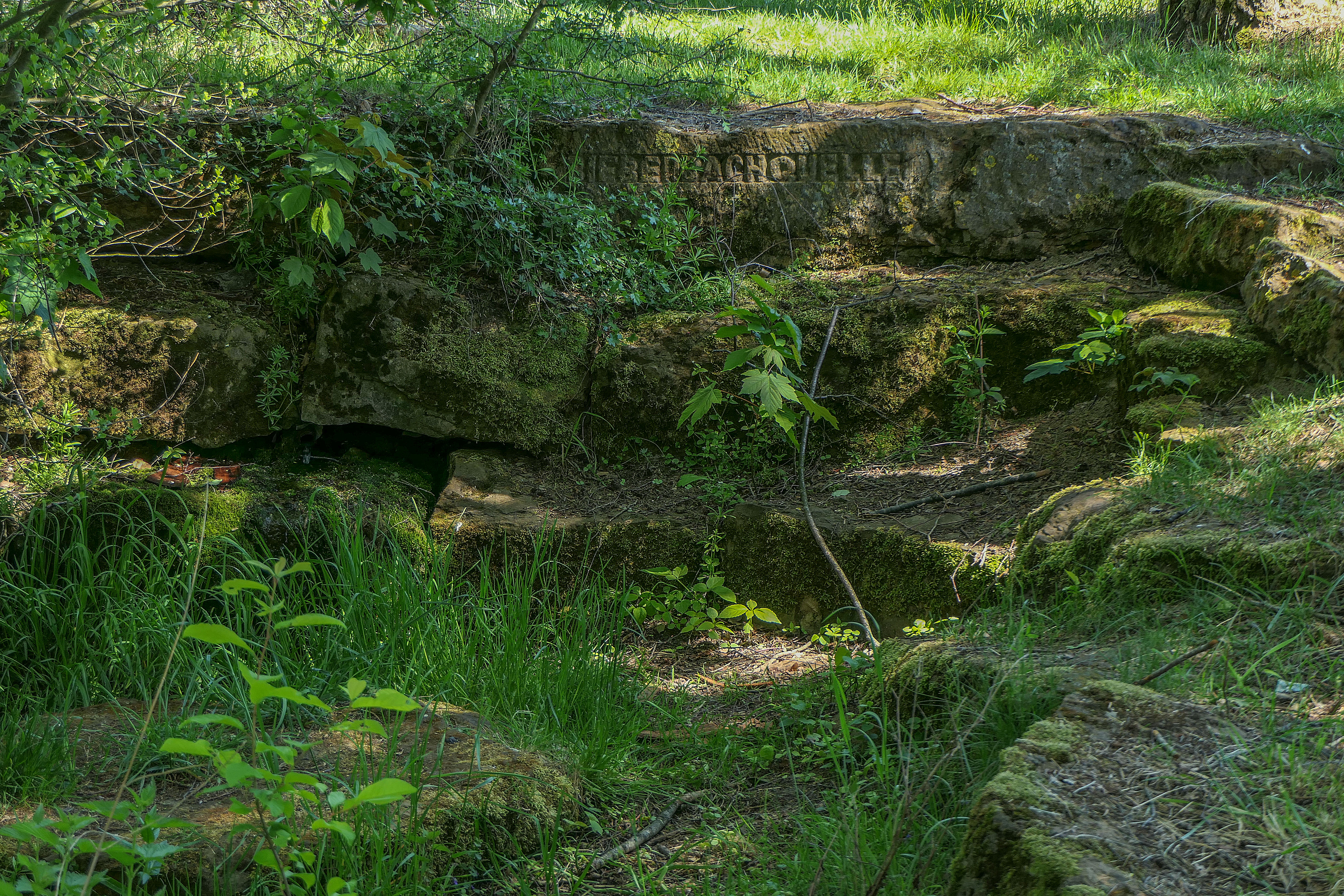
- The source of the Biberbach

Location
- Country: Germany
- State: Bavaria

Physical characteristics
- Mouth
  - location: Main
  - coordinates: 50.1608°N 11.1183°E
- Length: 13.3 km (8.3 mi)

Basin features
- Progression: Main→ Rhine→ North Sea

Biberbach (German pronunciation: [ˈbiːbɐbax]) is a river of Bavaria, Germany. It flows into the Mühlbach, a branch of the Main, in Michelau in Oberfranken.

== See also ==
- List of rivers of Bavaria
