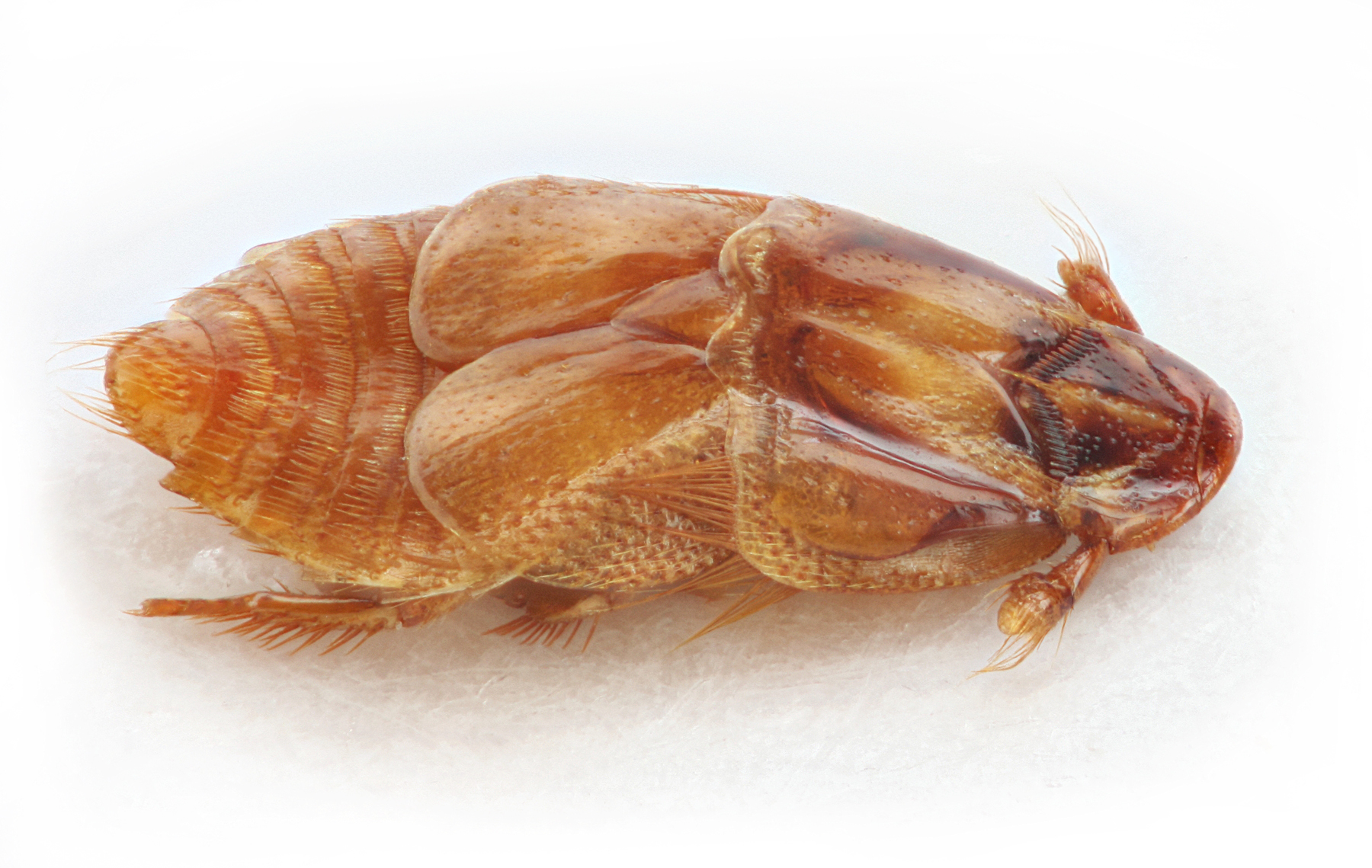
- Beaver beetle, Platypsyllus castoris

Scientific classification
- Domain: Eukaryota
- Kingdom: Animalia
- Phylum: Arthropoda
- Class: Insecta
- Order: Coleoptera
- Suborder: Polyphaga
- Infraorder: Staphyliniformia
- Family: Leiodidae
- Subfamily: Platypsyllinae; Ritsema, 1869

Synonyms
- Leptinidae LeConte, 1872

= Platypsyllinae =

Subfamily of beetles

Platypsyllinae is a subfamily of the family Leiodidae, known as mammal-nest beetles. The group was formerly known as the family Leptinidae but the name Platypsyllidae had seniority, and is now ranked as a subfamily.

== Genera ==
- Leptinillus Horn, 1882
- Leptinus Müller, 1817
- Platypsyllus Ritsema, 1869
- Silphopsyllus Olsufiev, 1923
