= Bjurälven =

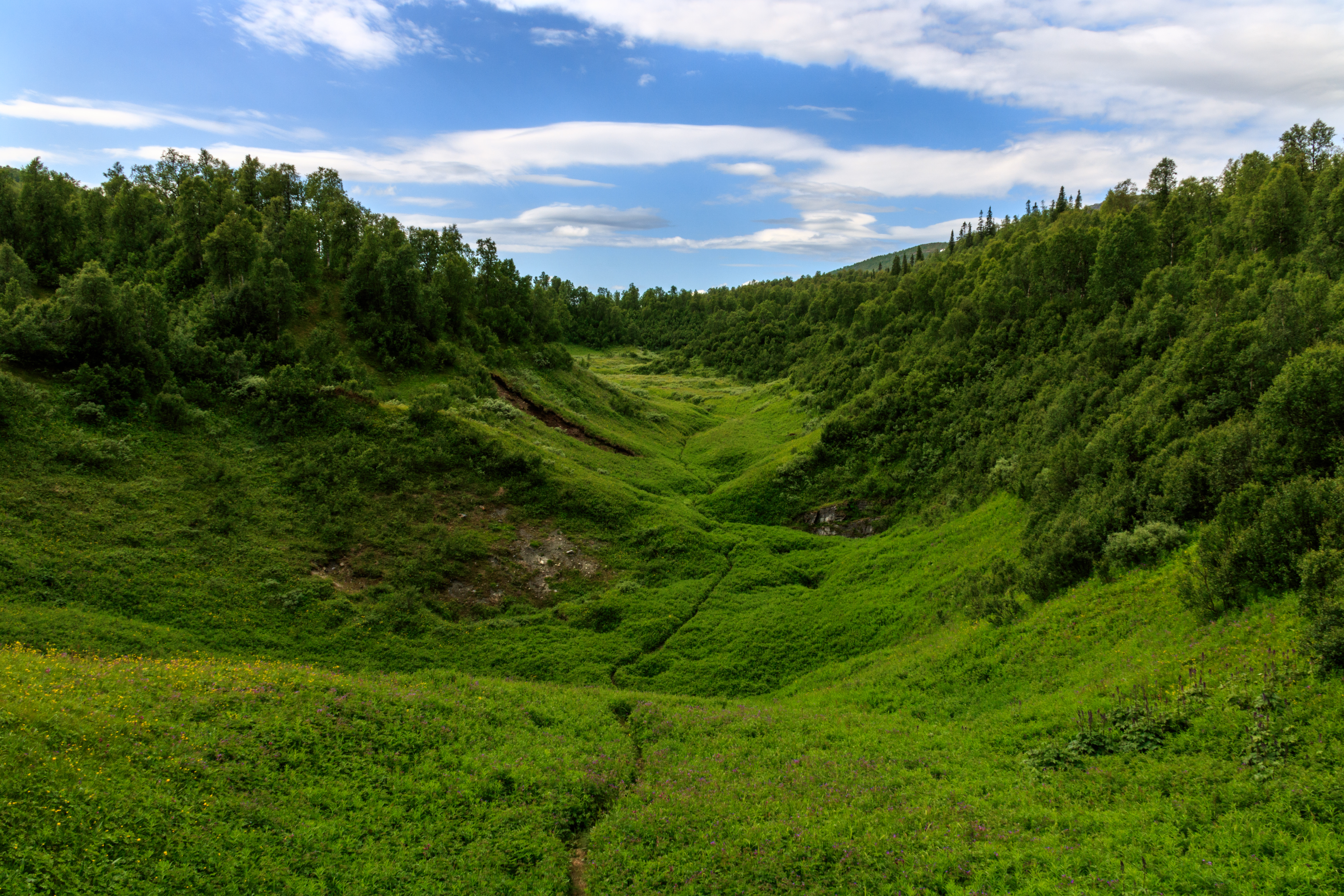

Location
- Country: Sweden
- County: Jämtland

Physical characteristics
- Mouth: Leipikvattnet
  - coordinates: 64°55′N 14°09′E

Bjurälven is a river in Jämtland, Sweden. The river is partially underground and has a famous cave area.
