= Bóbrka =

Bóbrka may refer to the following places:

- Historical Polish name for Bibrka, Ukraine
- Bóbrka, Lesko County in Subcarpathian Voivodeship (south-east Poland)
- Bóbrka, Gmina Chorkówka, Krosno County in Subcarpathian Voivodeship (south-east Poland)
