= Bibern =

Bibern can mean either of two municipalities of Switzerland:

- Bibern, Solothurn
- Bibern, Schaffhausen
