= Bièvres =

Bièvres may refer to the following places in France:

- Bièvres, Aisne, a commune in the department of Aisne
- Bièvres, Ardennes, a commune in the department of Ardennes
- Bièvres, Essonne, a commune in the department of Essonne
