= August von Bibra =

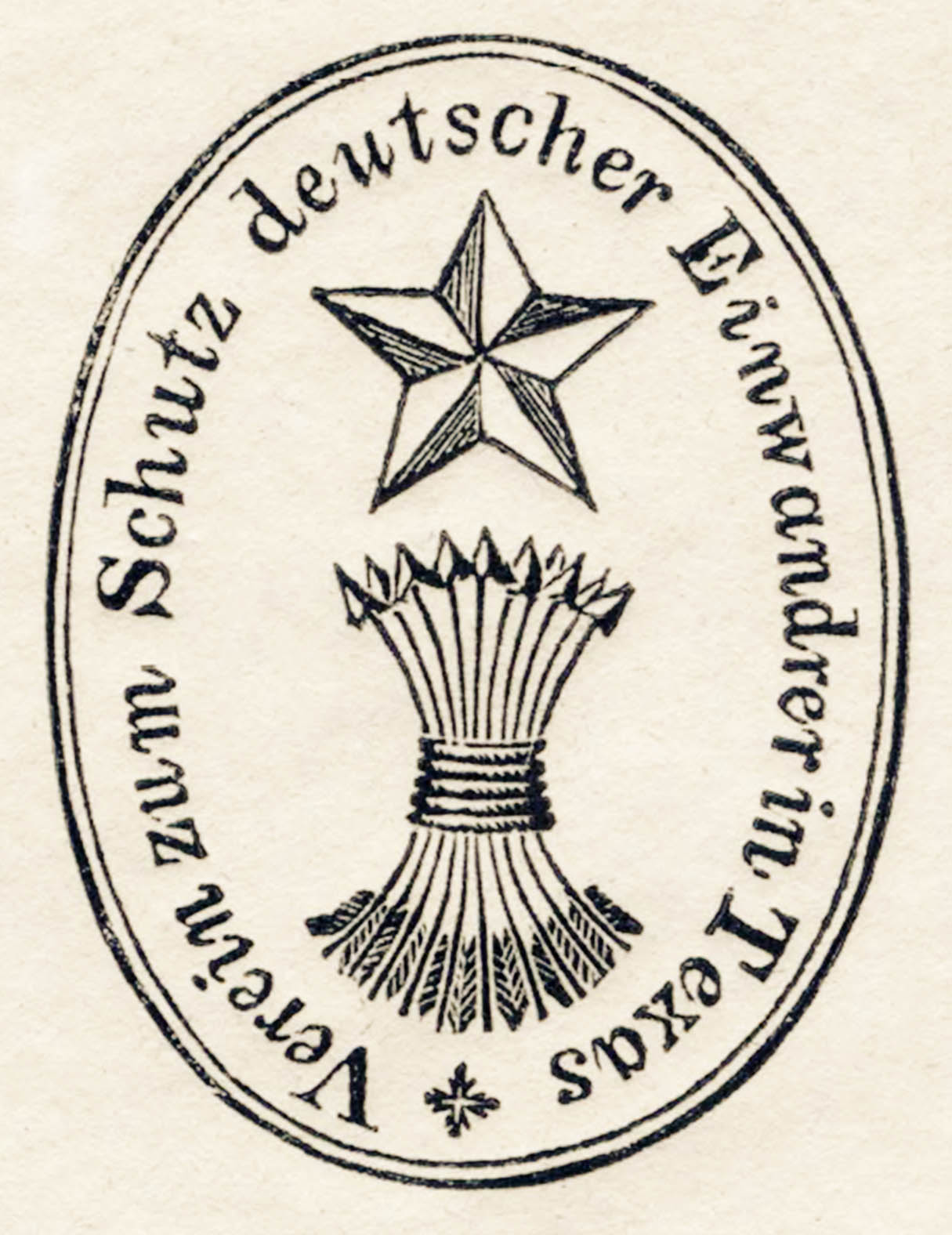
Logo of Verein zum Schutze Deutscher Einwanderer in Texas

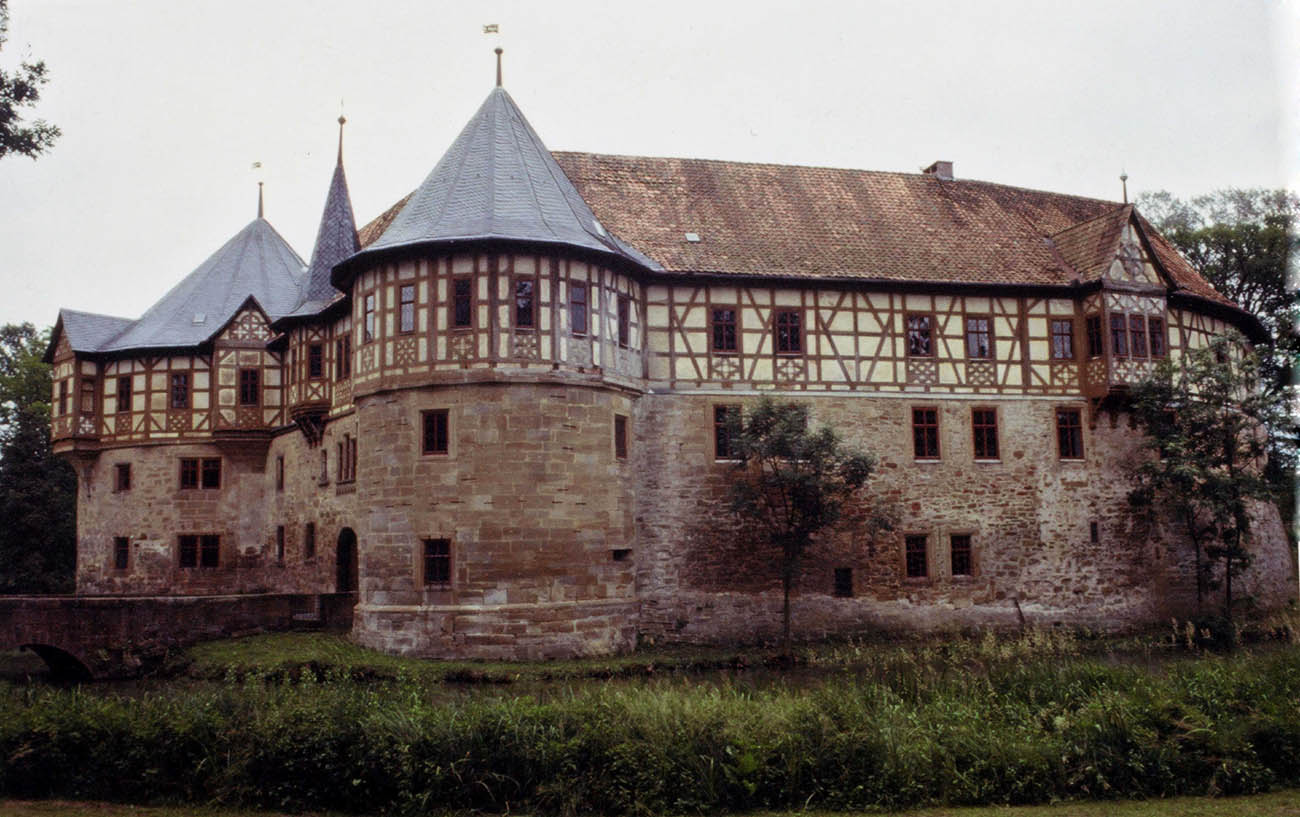
Castle Irmelshausen

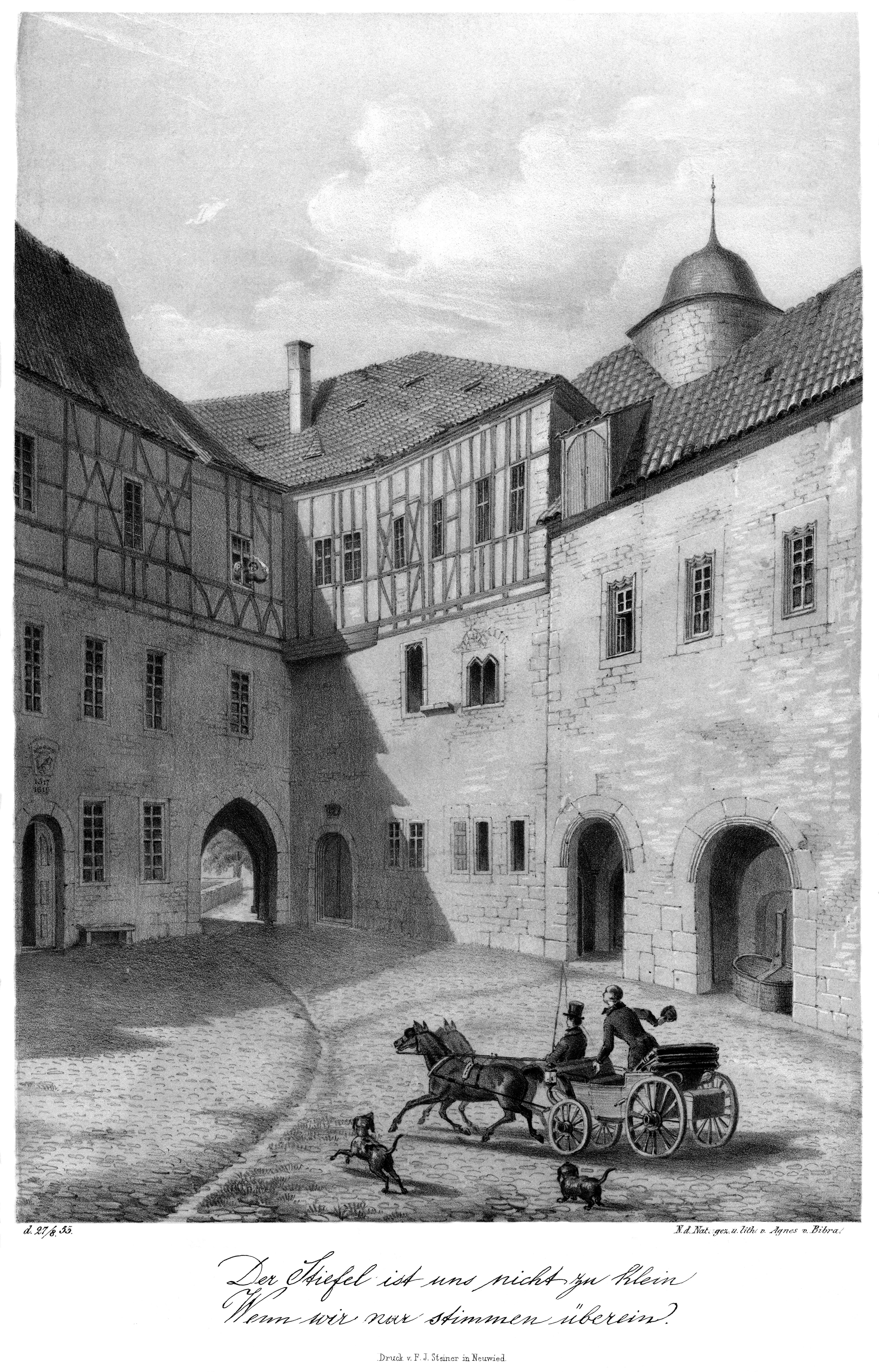
Print of Irmelshausen by August's wife Agnes

August Ludwig Karl Georg Friedrich Freiherr von Bibra (30 January 1808, Romrod – 1894) was director of the business affairs of Hermann, prince of Wied. He became general manager of the Adelsverein, or Verein zum Schutze Deutscher Einwanderer in Texas ("Society for the Protection of German Immigrants in Texas").

== Verein zum Schutze Deutscher Einwanderer in Texas ==
The Verein zum Schutze Deutscher Einwanderer in Texas was an emigration enterprise first organized by a group of German noblemen in 1842 that resulted in the founding of New Braunfels, Fredericksburg, and other German communities in Texas. August, as the director of the business affairs of Hermann, Prince of Wied, was privy from its inception to the development of the Verein. Hermann, Prince of Wied purchased a share in the society as he was engaged to the sister of Wilhelm, Duke of Nassau, the protector of the society. He took no active part in the society until 1847, when it became apparent because of debts and dissension, that a new more business like approach must be taken in order to save the reputations and investments of the noblemen. From 1847 on Bibra was actively involved in the affairs of the Verein; and, when the prince was elected president in 1851, Bibra took over complete management of the enterprise. Bibra struggled to repay the Verein debts and to revitalize the emigration program for more than ten years. He died in Germany in 1894.

== Family ==
August was from the older line of the Irmelshausen branch of the von Bibra family. Born in Romrod, he was the child of Christian Ernst Heinrich von Bibra (1772–1844) and Luise Charlotte Amalia Riedesel zu Eisenbach (1781–1855). August was married to Agnes Freiin von Stoltzenberg (1823–1866). Agnes was an artist. They had five children: Berthold, Marie, Maximilian, Luise Therese and Anna Carolina. The children were close friends of the future queen of Romania, Elisabeth of Wied. She wrote that Marie was her best friend growing up. Writing under her pen name, Carmen Sylva, she wrote about powerful effect of their premature death on her.

== Additional References ==
- Gothaisches Genealogisches Taschenbuch der Freiherrlichen Häuser. 1894 Justus Perthes Publisher
- Carmen Sylva (Elizabeth of Wied, Queen Elizabeth of Romania), Songs of Toil
- Carmen Sylva (Elizabeth of Wied, Queen Elizabeth of Romania), From Memory's Shrine: The Reminiscences of Carmen Sylva J. B. Lippincott Company, Date Published: 1911, p. 238.
- MARTIN STINGL, REICHFREIHEIT UND FÜRSTENDIENST DIE DIENSTBEZIEHUNGEN DER BIBRA 1500 BIS 1806, Verlag Degener & Co, 1994, 341 pages, ISBN 3-7686-9131-4;
- WILHELM FRHR. VON BIBRA, Geschicte der Familie der Freiherrn von Bibra, 1870, p. 180;
