= Bobr (air base) =

Airport

- IATA: none; ICAO: ZCS8

Summary
- Airport type: Military
- Operator: unknown
- Location: Talacyn
- Elevation AMSL: 646 ft / 197 m
- Coordinates: 54°22′30″N 029°22′36″E
- Interactive map of Bobr

Runways
| Direction | Length | | Surface |
| Direction | ft | m | Surface |
|---|---|---|---|
| | 10,499 | 3,200 |

Bobr (also given as Bobr East) was an air base in Belarus located 20 km (12 mi) west of Talacyn. It appears to have been a forward deployment field. It is now plowed under into farmland. A new major highway connecting Minsk to Moscow is just 1 km (0.62 mi) north of the former site.
