= Bober (surname) =

Bober is a surname. Notable people with the surname include:

- Anton Bober (born 1982), former Russian football midfielder
- Bernard Bober (born 1950), Slovak Catholic prelate, Archbishop of Košice
- Chris Bober (born 1976), former American football offensive lineman.
- Harry Bober (1915–1988), American art historian and professor, specializing in Medieval history.
- Phyllis Pray Bober (1920–2002), American art historian and professor, specializing in Renaissance art and culinary history.
- Richard Bober
- Robert Bober
- Ryszard Bober (born 1956), Polish politician.
- Stanislas Bober (1930–1975), French professional road bicycle racer.

== See also ==
- Johann von Böber, German teacher, entomologist and botanist
