= Johann von Böber =

Johann von Böber or Boeber or Johann Jacob Beberi (22 December 1746 – 16 July 1820) was a German teacher, entomologist and botanist. He was first a professor at St. Peter's College Jelgava then in 1796. became an advisor to the Academy of Sciences in St. Petersburg. In 1809 he wrote Description de quelques nouvelles espèces de papillons découverts en Sibérie Mém. Soc. Imp. Nat. Mosco 2: 305–310, 1pl. His botanical works are

- (1780): Freimaurerlieder zum Gebrauch der Vereinigten Logen in Russland, St. Petersburg.
- (1787): Freimaurerlieder zum Gebrauch der vereinigten Logen in Russland, St. Petersburg
- (1788): Auswahl von Freimaurerliedern. Durch die E. Loge Muse „Urania“ gesammelt von Böber, St. Petersburg
- (1793): Verzeichnis der Pflanzen, die von Ritter J. von Böber in Taurien und Katharinoslavischen Gouvernement gasammelt worden sind, in: G. Ch. Reichs Magazin des Pflanzenreichs, Erlangen, 1793, Bd. I, S. 154–166.
- (1793): Schreiben des Herrn Goffrath und Studien-Direktor Böber aus Ekaterinoslaw vom 25.Oktober 1792, in: Neue Nordische Beiträge, 1793, Bd. 6, S. 256–264.

His collection of Coleoptera is in the Zoological Museum of the Zoological Institute of the Russian Academy of Sciences. His collection of Lepidoptera is believed to be lost or destroyed.
