= A. alesi =

A. alesi may refer to:

- Abacetus alesi, a species of ground beetle
- Acmaeoderella alesi, a species of jewel beetle in the genus Acmaeoderella
- Aculomicrus alesi, a species of water scavenger beetle in the subfamily Sphaeridiinae
- Agathidium alesi, a species of round fungus beetle in the genus Agathidium
- Agrilus alesi, a species of jewel beetle
- Anisotoma alesi, a species of round fungus beetle in the genus Anisotoma
- Anthobiomorphus alesi, a species of rove beetle in the tribe Anthophagini
- Atheta alesi, a species of rove beetle in the genus Atheta
