= List of heads of the New York State College of Forestry =

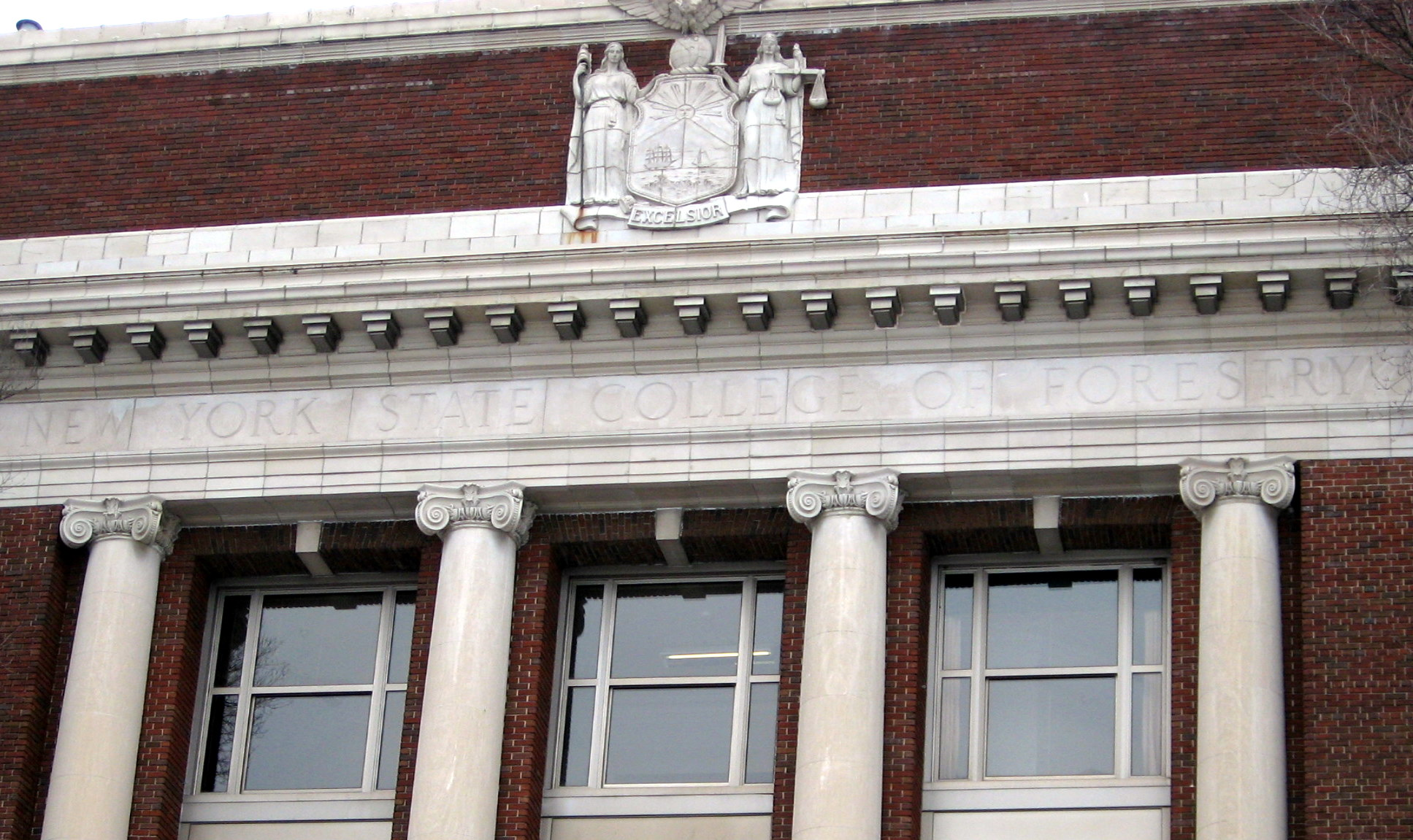
Bray Hall, the administration building of the New York State College of Forestry in Syracuse, New York

This article lists heads of the New York State College of Forestry, both at Cornell University and later at Syracuse University; and its successor, the State University of New York College of Environmental Science and Forestry, in Syracuse, New York.

== Deans ==
- Bernhard Fernow, Dean, New York State College of Forestry at Cornell University, 1898–1903
- William L. Bray, Dean, New York State College of Forestry at Syracuse University, 1911–12
- Hugh P. Baker, Dean, New York State College of Forestry at Syracuse University, 1912–20
- F. Franklin Moon, Dean, New York State College of Forestry at Syracuse University, 1920–27
- Nelson C. Brown, Acting Dean, New York State College of Forestry at Syracuse University, 1927–30
- Hugh P. Baker, Dean, New York State College of Forestry at Syracuse University, 1930–33
- Samuel N. Spring, Dean, New York State College of Forestry at Syracuse University, 1933–44
- Joseph S. Illick, Dean, New York State College of Forestry at Syracuse University, 1944–51
- Hardy L. Shirley, Dean, State University College of Forestry at Syracuse University, 1952–67
- Edwin C. Jahn, Dean, State University College of Forestry at Syracuse University, 1967–69

== Presidents ==
- Edward E. Palmer, President, State University of New York College of Environmental Science and Forestry, 1969–83
- Ross S. Whaley, President, State University of New York College of Environmental Science and Forestry, 1984–99
- Cornelius B. Murphy, Jr., President, State University of New York College of Environmental Science and Forestry, 2000–13
- Quentin D. Wheeler, President, State University of New York College of Environmental Science and Forestry, 2014–18
- David C. Amberg, Interim President, State University of New York College of Environmental Science and Forestry, 2018 – May 31, 2020
- Joanne M. Mahoney, President, State University of New York College of Environmental Science and Forestry, November 4, 2020 – present

== Officers in charge ==
- Joseph L. Rufo, Officer in Charge, State University of New York College of Environmental Science and Forestry, June 1, 2020 – November 4, 2020

== See also ==
- Cornell University
- State University of New York
