= Agathidiini =

Scientific classification
- Kingdom: Animalia
- Phylum: Arthropoda
- Clade: Pancrustacea
- Class: Insecta
- Order: Coleoptera
- Suborder: Polyphaga
- Infraorder: Staphyliniformia
- Family: Leiodidae
- Subfamily: Leiodinae
- Tribe: Agathidiini; Westwood, 1838

Tribe of beetles

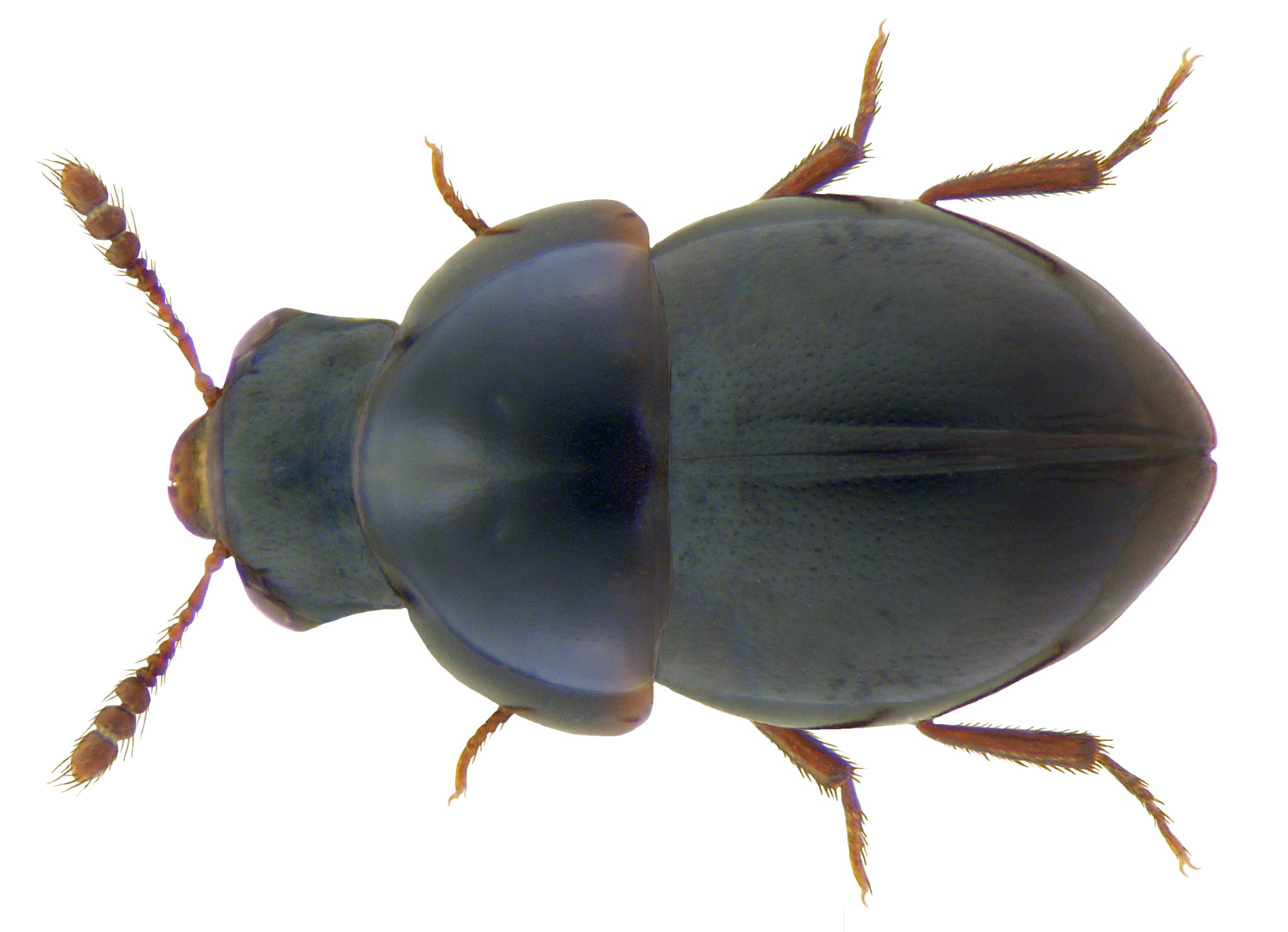
Agathidium atrum

Agathidiini is a tribe of round fungus beetles which feed on slime moulds.

== Taxonomy ==
Agathidiini contains the following genera:

- Besuchetionella
- Stetholiodes
- Decuria
- Pseudoagathidium
- Afroagathidium
- Liodopria
- Cyrtoplastus
- Gelae
- Amphicyllis
- Anisotoma
- Agathidium
