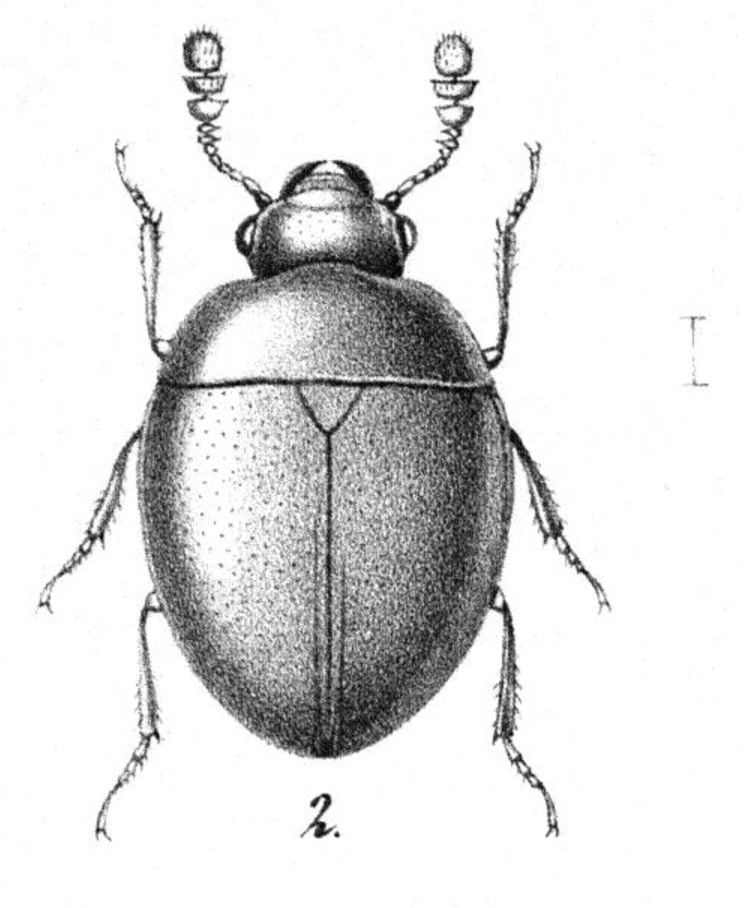
- Gelae cognatum

Scientific classification
- Domain: Eukaryota
- Kingdom: Animalia
- Phylum: Arthropoda
- Class: Insecta
- Order: Coleoptera
- Suborder: Polyphaga
- Infraorder: Staphyliniformia
- Family: Leiodidae
- Subfamily: Leiodinae
- Tribe: Agathidiini
- Genus: Gelae; Miller and Wheeler, 2004

Type species
- Gelae donut Miller and Wheeler, 2004

Diversity
- 8 described species

= Gelae =

Genus of beetles

Gelae (/ˈdʒɛli/) is a genus of round fungus beetles belonging to the family Leiodidae. The beetles are found in different parts of Central and North America. They are small and rounded, feeding on slime moulds. They were originally placed in the genus Agathidium following the discovery of the first species, G. cognatum, in 1878. The taxonomic position was revised with description of new species in 2004 by American entomologists Kelly B. Miller and Quentin D. Wheeler. Upon creation of the new genus, the five new species are Gelae baen (sounding like "jelly bean"), G. belae ("jelly belly"), G. donut ("jelly doughnut"), G. fish ("jelly fish"), and G. rol ("jelly roll").

== Discovery and taxonomy ==
The first species of Gelae discovered was Agathidium cognatum (now Gelae cognatum). John Lawrence LeConte discovered the only specimen at Marquette, Michigan, near Lake Superior, in 1878. Another specimen was found by Andrew Matthews in 1887 from the mountains of Totonicapán in Guatemala, and placed it under the then known genus Agathidium. Henry Clinton Fall collected the third species in 1934 from Sugar Pine, California, US. In 1998, Stewart Blaine Peck, Pedro Gnaspini and Alfred F. Newton Jr. reported the occurrence of closely related but distinct species from their extensive cataloguing of round fungus beetles. They noted that the species had unique features different from Agathidium and other beetles, and labelled them under "Undescribed Genus 7". With reexamination of the tribe Agathidiini to which they belong, they were reclassified under a new genus Gelae in 2004. Kelly B. Miller and Quentin D. Wheeler described their significant characters and regrouped them, along with five new species, G. baen, G. belae, G. donut, G. fish, and G. rol. They derived the name from a Latin word gelatus, which means "congealed" or "jellied", and to be pronounced like the English word "jelly". This refers to the slime moulds in which they were found. The species names are merely wordplays without any taxonomical jargon, and are simply "whimsical arrangement of letters", as the authors noted.

== Description ==
Species of Gelae are small and almost spherical beetles, with highly curved and dome-shaped backs. As with other agathidiines, their food source is slime moulds. According to a cladogram published in 2014, they are most closely related to Liodopria under the same tribe, and are considered as sister taxa. In contrast to other round fungus beetle, Gelae have exactly 11 antenna segments (antennomeres), the antennomere VII being similar in size and shape to antennomere VI, and an antenna club with three segments. An extension behind the eye called postocular temporum and its surrounding ridge called supraocular carina, found in other beetles, are absent. The middle front head region called the anterior clypeus is also comparatively extended. In addition the elytra (forewings) are moderately lined with punctures, and do not form longitudinal series.

== Species ==
As of 2014, there are eight valid species of Gelae, as below:

1. G. fish Miller and Wheeler, 2004 was actually discovered first in 1977 from Chiriqui, Panama. It is also found throughout southern Mexico and Central America. It is relatively small compared to other species, measuring only 1.84–1.88 mm in length and 0.41–0.48 in breadth. It is mostly brown, with patches of yellow-brown, in colour. It has distinct male genitalia. The genital part has a pair of extended stick-like projections.
2. G. belae Miller and Wheeler, 2004 was discovered in 2003 from Oaxaca, Mexico. It is also quite small, measuring 2.10–2.14 mm in length, and 0.25–0.27 mm in breadth, and is more spherical. Its head is narrow towards the posterior. The body is yellow-brown in colour, with yellow antennae.
3. G. baen Miller and Wheeler, 2004 was also discovered in 1986 from Oaxaca, Mexico. It is not known in any other region. Its body is moderately large and measures 2.45–3.26 mm in length, and 0.47–0.51 mm in breadth. Its main body is yellow, with brown elytra and margins, and yellow antennae. Its head is broad and sharply constricted behind the eyes.
4. G. donut Miller and Wheeler, 2004 was discovered in 1983 from Cerro Carpish, Peru. It is found only in the highlands of Peru and Bolivia. It is the largest species measuring 3.03–3.46 mm in length and 0.45–0.46 mm in breadth. It is mostly brown, but with yellow appendages. Head is not too broad and is dorsally flattened. Elytra is also very big.
5. G. rol Miller and Wheeler, 2004 was discovered in 2002 from Workman Creek, Sierra Ancha, Arizona. It is found only in the mountains of southern Arizona. It is large-sized measuring 2.75–2.76 mm in length and 0.46–0.48 mm in breadth. It is brown on most of its body but with yellow-coloured appendages.
6. G. parile (Fall, 1934) was first discovered from Sugar Pine, California. It is found in all parts of US and Canada. Externally, it is very similar to G. parvulum. Its head is moderately constricted. Unlike other species, its middle body margin is not sharp, while the terminal region is very sharp. It measures 2.28–2.47 mm in length, and 0.46 mm in breadth. The main body is brown, while the peripherals, legs and antennae are yellow-brown.
7. G. parvulum (LeConte, 1878) was discovered from the shores of Lake Superior. Other than the original location. further specimens are collected so far only in California It is quite robust with body length of 2.35–2.55 mm and breadth of 0.48–0.52 mm. Its colour and most external features are similar to those of G. parile. But it has sharp lateral margin, and large median lobe in male.
8. G. cognatum (Matthews, 1887) was the first species discovered. It is found in Mexico, Guatemala, Panama, Honduras and Costa Rica. It is a medium-sized species measuring 2.30–3.01 mm in length and 0.47–0.50 mm in breadth. Its body is mostly brown with tinges of yellow and yellow-brown in some parts.
