= Ray Stannard Baker =

American journalist and writer (1870–1946)

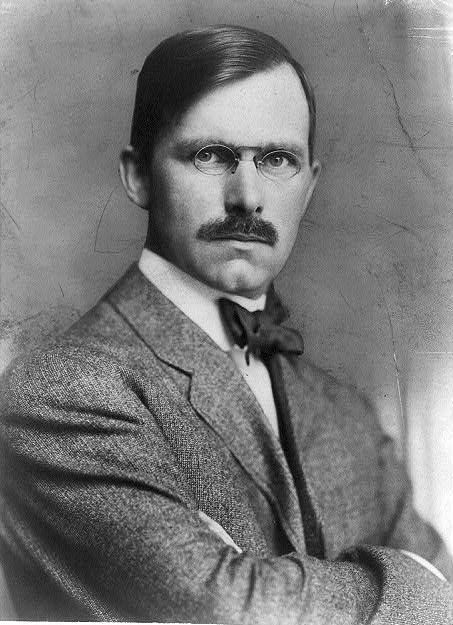
- Born: April 17, 1870; Lansing, Michigan, U.S.
- Died: July 12, 1946 (aged 76); Amherst, Massachusetts, U.S.
- Other name: "David Grayson"
- Education: Michigan State Agricultural College; University of Michigan
- Relatives: Hugh P. Baker (brother)
- Awards: Pulitzer Prize for Biography or Autobiography

Ray Stannard Baker (April 17, 1870 – July 12, 1946) (also known by his pen name David Grayson) was an American journalist, historian, biographer, and writer.

== Biography ==
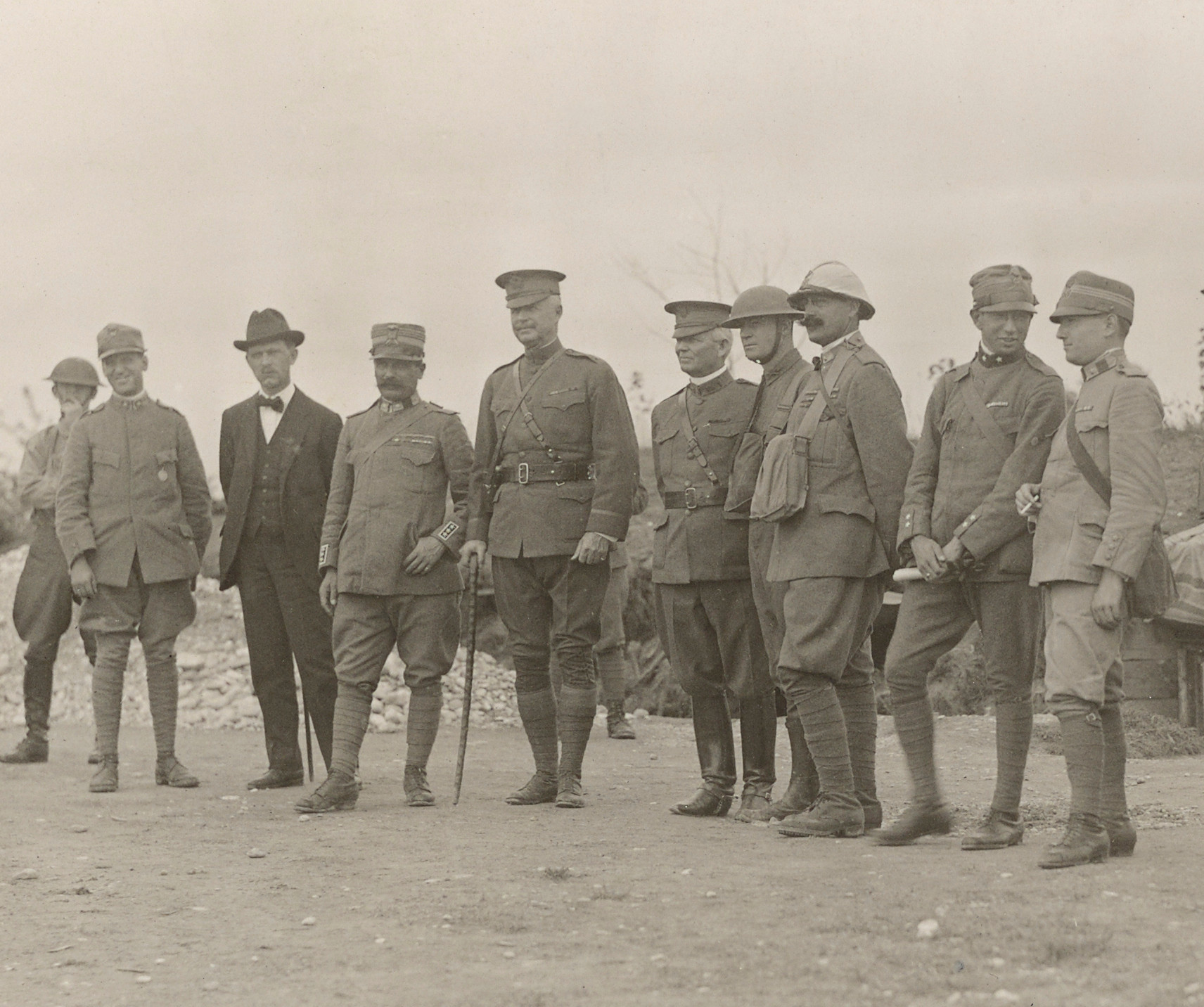
Baker as an observer with staff officers on the Italian front in late 1918.

Baker was born in Lansing, Michigan. After graduating from the Michigan State Agricultural College (now Michigan State University), he attended law school at the University of Michigan in 1891 before launching his career as a journalist in 1892 with the Chicago News-Record, where he covered the Pullman Strike and Coxey's Army in 1894.

In 1898, Baker joined the staff of McClure's, a pioneer muckraking magazine, and quickly rose to prominence along with Lincoln Steffens and Ida Tarbell. He also dabbled in fiction, writing children's stories for the magazine Youth's Companion and a nine-volume series of stories about rural living in America, the first of which was titled Adventures in Contentment (1907) under his pseudonym David Grayson, which reached millions of readers worldwide.

In 1907, dissatisfied with the muckraker label, Baker, Steffens, and Tarbell left McClure's and founded The American Magazine. In 1908, after the 1906 Atlanta Race Riot got him involved, Baker published the book Following the Color Line: An Account of Negro Citizenship in the American Democracy, becoming the first prominent journalist to examine America's racial divide; it was extremely successful. Sociologist Rupert Vance says it is:

... the best account of race relations in the South during the period—one that reads like field notes for the future historian. This account was written during the zenith of Washingtonian movement and shows the optimism that it inspired among both liberals and moderates. The book is also notable for its realistic accounts of Negro town life.

He followed up that work with numerous articles in the following decade.

In 1910, he moved to the town of Amherst, Massachusetts.

In 1912, Baker published The Friendly Road, an account of the places he visited and people he met while on a walking tour of the United States. In that year's presidential election Baker supported the presidential candidacy of Woodrow Wilson, which led to a close relationship between the two men, and in 1918 Wilson sent Baker to Europe to study the war situation. He was in connection with the future president of Czechoslovak Republic Thomas Garrigue Masaryk in America yet, from May 1918. During peace negotiations, Baker served as Wilson's press secretary at Versailles. He eventually published 15 volumes about Wilson and internationalism, including the six-volume The Public Papers of Woodrow Wilson (1925–1927) with William Edward Dodd, and the eight-volume Woodrow Wilson: Life and Letters (1927–1939), the last two volumes of which won the Pulitzer Prize for Biography or Autobiography in 1940. He served as an adviser on Darryl F. Zanuck's 1944 film Wilson.

Baker wrote two autobiographies, Native American (1941) and American Chronicle (1945).

Baker died of a heart attack in Amherst, Massachusetts, and is buried in Amherst's Wildwood Cemetery. Buildings have been named in honor of both Ray Stannard Baker and David Grayson (his pen name). A dormitory, Grayson Hall, is at the University of Massachusetts Amherst. The David Grayson Elementary School is in Waterford, Michigan. An academic building, Baker Hall, is at Michigan State University. A trail in Amherst has also been named for Baker.

== Personal life ==
In 1896, Baker married Jessie Beal. They had four children: Alice Beal (1897), James Stannard (1899), Roger Denio (1902), and Rachel Moore (1906). Baker's brother Hugh Potter Baker was the president of Massachusetts State College, which later became the University of Massachusetts.

== Writings ==
=== Books ===
- Shop Talks on the Wonders of Crafts (Chicago, 1895)
- Our New Prosperity (New York: Doubleday & Company, McClure, 1900)
- The Boys Book of Inventions (London: Harper & Brothers, 1900)
- Seen in Germany (New York: McClure, Phillips, 1901)
- Boys' Second Book of Inventions (New York: McClure, Phillips, 1903)
- Following the Color Line: An Account of Negro Citizenship in the American Democracy (New York: Doubleday, Page & Company, New York, 1908) read online
- New Ideals in Healing (New York: Frederick A. Stokes Company, 1909)
- Adventures in Friendship (New York: Doubleday, Page & Company, 1910) read online
- Adventures in Contentment (1907) (as David Grayson)
- The Atlanta Riot (1907)
- The Spiritual Unrest (New York: Frederick A. Stokes Company, 1910) read online
- The Friendly Road (Doubleday, 1912) (as David Grayson)
- Hempfield: A Novel (Doubleday, 1915) (as David Grayson)
- Great Possessions: A New Series of Adventures (New York: Doubleday, Page & Company, 1917) (as David Grayson) read online
- What Wilson Did at Paris (New York, 1919)
- Woodrow Wilson and World Settlement (3 vols.) (New York: Doubleday, Page & Company, 1922–1923) read vol. 1 online, read vol. 2 online, read vol. 3 online
- An American Pioneer in Science: The Life and Service of William James Beal, with Jessie B. Baker (Amherst, Mass: Privately printed, 1925)
- Adventures in Understanding (New York: Doubleday, Page & Company, 1925) (as David Grayson)
- The Public Papers of Woodrow Wilson. With William Edward Dodd. Six volumes. (1925–1927)
- Woodrow Wilson: Life and Letters (8 vols.) (New York: Doubleday, Page, and Doubleday, Doran) (1927–1939), "Youth, 1856-1890" (1927), "Princeton, 1890-1910" (1927), "Governor, 1910–1913 (1931)", "President, 1913-1914" (1931), "Neutrality 1914-1915" (1935), "Facing War, 1915-1917" (1937), "War Leader, April 6, 1917 - February 28, 1918" (1939), "Armistice, March 1 - November 11, 1918 (1939)" (1940 Pulitzer Prize for Biography or Autobiography).
- Woodrow Wilson: Neutrality, 1914-1915 (New York: Doubleday, Page & Company, 1935) read online
- The Countryman's Year (New York: Doubleday, Page, and Doubleday, Doran, 1936) (as David Grayson)
- The Capture, Death and Burial of J. Wilkes Booth (Poor Richard Press, 1940) read online
- Native American: The Book of My Youth (New York: Charles Scribner's Sons, 1941)
- American Chronicle: The Autobiography of Ray Stannard Baker (as David Grayson) (Charles Scribner's Son, 1945) read online
- A Journalist's Diplomatic Mission: Ray Stannard Baker's World War I Diary. John Maxwell Hamilton, ed. Baton Rouge, LA: Louisiana State University Press, 2012.

=== Articles ===
- "The Reign of Lawlessness: Anarchy and Despotism in Colorado", McClure's Magazine, vol. 23, no. 1 (May 1904), pp. 43–57.
