= Hardy L. Shirley =

- Died: July 24, 1996

Hardy L. Shirley (died 1996) was an American forester, author and dean of the SUNY College of Environmental Science and Forestry.

== Early life and education ==
Shirley graduated from Indiana University in 1922 and received his doctorate in 1928 from the School of Forestry at Yale University.

== Career ==
Shirley taught at the University of Nevada and Boyce Thompson Institute in Yonkers. He was senior silviculturist at the Lake States Forest Experiment Station in St. Paul, Minnesota, and was director of the U.S. Forestry Service experiment Station in Philadelphia, Pennsylvania.

From 1945 to 1952 Shirley was the assistant dean of the SUNY College of Environmental Science and Forestry. From 1952 to 1967 Shirley was dean of the SUNY College of Environmental Science and Forestry. During his tenure as Dean of SUNY ESF, graduate enrollment more than tripled, the college became the first to offer bachelor's and, master's degrees in landscape architecture and the Hugh P. Baker Wood Products Lab-oratory was constructed on the college's main campus in Syracuse, New York.

Academic offices
| Preceded by Joseph S. Illick | Dean of the New York State College of Forestry; 1952–67 | Succeeded by Edwin C. Jahn |
