= Gelae donut =

Scientific classification
- Kingdom: Animalia
- Phylum: Arthropoda
- Clade: Pancrustacea
- Class: Insecta
- Order: Coleoptera
- Suborder: Polyphaga
- Infraorder: Staphyliniformia
- Family: Leiodidae
- Genus: Gelae
- Species: G. donut

Binomial name
- Gelae donut Miller and Wheeler, 2004

Species of beetle from South America

Gelae donut is a species of beetle in the family Leiodidae. It is found in South America. Adults are 3.03–3.46 mm (0.119–0.136 in) long, and brown and yellow in color. It likely feeds on slime molds and fungi. Like other species in the genus Gelae, it has received media attention due to its scientific name, which is a play on jelly donut.

== Taxonomy and etymology ==
Gelae donut was described with its current name in 2004, on the basis of a male holotype collected at an elevation of 2,500 m (8,200 ft) on Cerro Carpish in Huanúco, Peru. The generic name Gelae is from a shortened form of the Latin word gelatus, meaning jellied, and is pronounced like the word "jelly". The specific epithet is a combination of letters that is pronounced like the word "donut". Taken together, the scientific name is pronounced "jelly doughnut", a play on jelly donut. G. donut has received media attention, along with other species in Gelae, due to its humorous scientific name.

Gelae donut is one of eight species in the genus Gelae, and is a part of a group of four similar species that also includes G. rol, G. baen and G. cognatum.

== Description ==
Gelae donut is a large species for its genus, with a total body length of 3.03–3.46 mm (0.119–0.136 in). It has a brown head and yellowish-brown clypeus. The head is moderately broad and dorsally flattened, with large, protruding eyes. The prothorax is yellow with large medial brown macules. The elytra is brown, being darker at the base. The underside, legs, and antennal club are also brown, while the antenna and palpi are yellow.

It is similar in appearance to Gelae rol, G. baen and G. cognatum, all of which have a large labrum and protuberant eyes, but can be told apart by its large size, the robust median lobe in males, the sharp apical reduction of the undersides, and the sharp apical curve of the dorsum.

== Ecology ==
Like other species in its genus, Gelae donut is likely to feed on slime molds and fungi.

== Distribution and habitat ==
Gelae donut is found in the highlands of Peru and Bolivia. It inhabits cloud forest and montane rainforest at elevations of 1,600–2,300 m (5,200–7,500 ft).
