= Edward E. Palmer =

Edward E. Palmer was the first president of the SUNY College of Environmental Science and Forestry and held that position from 1969 to 1983.

== Education ==
Palmer received his Bachelor of Arts degree from Middlebury College in Vermont, and his Doctorate from Syracuse University. He also received an honorary degree in law from Syracuse University. Although he never had any formal training in forestry, Dr. Palmer had a tree farm between Fabius, New York and Cuyler, New York that he bought in 1951 while he was still on the faculty of the Maxwell School at Syracuse University.

== Career ==
Before joining the SUNY College of Environmental Science and Forestry in 1969, Palmer directed SUNY's Overseas Academics Programs and spent nearly 30 years on the faculty of Syracuse University's Maxwell School of Citizenship and Public Affairs. In 1969 Dr. Palmer became the first president of the SUNY College of Environmental Science and Forestry and held this position until 1983.

Palmer brought several changes when he became president of the SUNY College of Environmental Science and Forestry. Before Palmer, all the head administrators at the college were deans. Palmer was the college's first president. He changed the school's name from the State University College of Forestry at Syracuse University to the College of Environmental Science and Forestry.

Academic offices
Preceded by Edwin C. Jahn	President of SUNY Environmental Science & Forestry; 1969 - 1983	Succeeded by Ross S. Whaley
