= Ross S. Whaley =

Ross S. Whaley was the second president of the State University of New York College of Environmental Science and Forestry, in Syracuse, New York, from 1984 to 1999. An economist by training, Whaley had previously been director of forest economics research at the United States Forest Service. Other prior institutional affiliations included faculty and administrative positions at the University of Massachusetts Amherst, Colorado State University, and Utah State University. Whaley served as president of the Society of American Foresters in 1991. Following his tenure as President of SUNY-ESF, Whaley served as chair of the Adirondack Park Agency from 2003 to 2007.

Academic offices
Preceded by Edward E. Palmer	President of SUNY Environmental Science & Forestry; 1984 - 1999	Succeeded by Cornelius B. Murphy, Jr.
