= Agathidium jasperanum =

Scientific classification
- Domain: Eukaryota
- Kingdom: Animalia
- Phylum: Arthropoda
- Class: Insecta
- Order: Coleoptera
- Suborder: Polyphaga
- Infraorder: Staphyliniformia
- Family: Leiodidae
- Genus: Agathidium
- Species: A. jasperanum

Binomial name
- Agathidium jasperanum Fall, 1934

Species of beetle

Agathidium jasperanum is a species of round fungus beetle in the family Leiodidae. This species is distinguishable from others in the group by the body somewhat elongate, the punctures on the head distinctly larger than those of pronotum, the elytral punctation coarser and denser than on head and pronotum and with some punctures more or less serially arranged, and the median lobe of the aedeagus elongate and narrow, with the apex slender and apically narrowly rounded. Its type locality is Jasper National Park, Alberta, hence the name.
