= Agathidium akallebregma =

Scientific classification
- Kingdom: Animalia
- Phylum: Arthropoda
- Clade: Pancrustacea
- Class: Insecta
- Order: Coleoptera
- Suborder: Polyphaga
- Infraorder: Staphyliniformia
- Family: Leiodidae
- Genus: Agathidium
- Species: A. akallebregma

Binomial name
- Agathidium akallebregma Miller and Wheeler, 2005

Species of beetle

Agathidium akallebregma is a species of round fungus beetle in the family Leiodidae. It is found in North America. It is named from the Greek words akalles, meaning ‘‘ugly’’, and bregma, meaning ‘‘face’’, for the unusually shaped anterior portion of the head in this species. It has a mandibular horn, moderately elongate body shape, and strongly concave posterior portion of the mesosternum.
