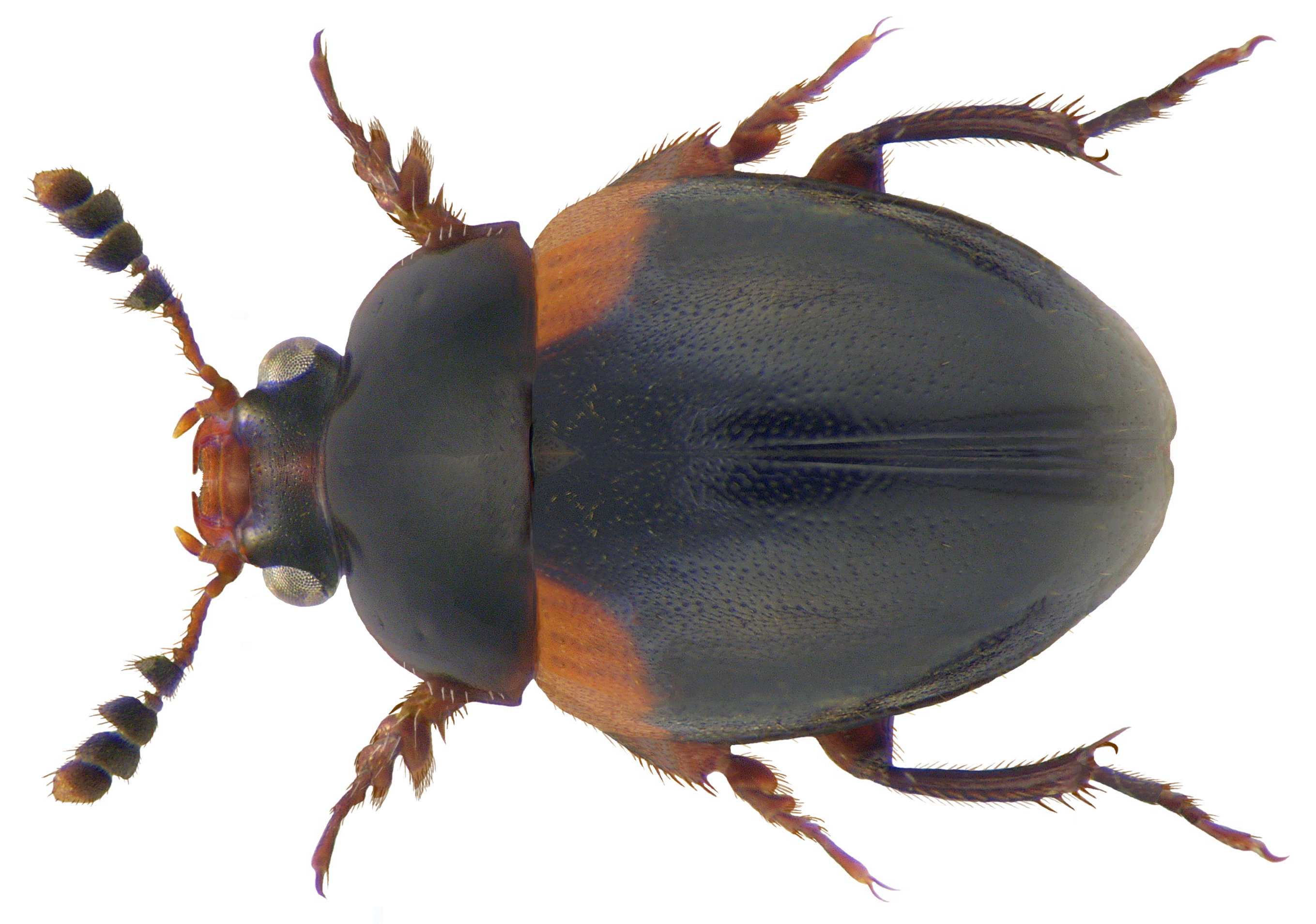

Scientific classification
- Kingdom: Animalia
- Phylum: Arthropoda
- Clade: Pancrustacea
- Class: Insecta
- Order: Coleoptera
- Suborder: Polyphaga
- Infraorder: Staphyliniformia
- Family: Leiodidae
- Genus: Anisotoma
- Species: A. humeralis

Binomial name
- Anisotoma humeralis (Fabricius, 1792)

= Anisotoma humeralis =

Species of beetle

Anisotoma humeralis is a species of round fungus beetle in the family Leiodidae. It is found in Europe and Northern Asia (excluding China) and North America.

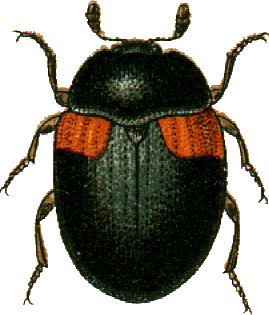

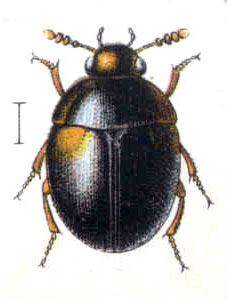
