= Agathidium cortezi =

Scientific classification
- Kingdom: Animalia
- Phylum: Arthropoda
- Class: Insecta
- Order: Coleoptera
- Suborder: Polyphaga
- Infraorder: Staphyliniformia
- Family: Leiodidae
- Genus: Agathidium
- Species: A. cortezi

Binomial name
- Agathidium cortezi Miller & Wheeler, 2005

Species of beetle

Agathidium cortezi is a species of round fungus beetles in the family Leiodidae. It is named after conquistador Hernan Cortés (misspelled as Cortez in the paper), conqueror of the Aztec empire and colonial administrator of New Spain.
