= Agathidium angulare =

Scientific classification
- Kingdom: Animalia
- Phylum: Arthropoda
- Clade: Pancrustacea
- Class: Insecta
- Order: Coleoptera
- Suborder: Polyphaga
- Infraorder: Staphyliniformia
- Family: Leiodidae
- Genus: Agathidium
- Species: A. angulare

Binomial name
- Agathidium angulare Mannerheim, 1852

Species of beetle

Agathidium angulare is a species of round fungus beetle. They are found in both the United States and Canada. They are known by the common name "angulated round fungus beetle."

== Description ==
Agathidium angulare beetles are relatively large compared to other beetles of their genus, reaching approximately 2.5mm in length. They have dark red heads, red pronotum, elytra, and venter, and a yellow mesosternum. Their antennae, palpi, and legs are brownish in color. Adult males have a long mandibular horn.
