= Amphicyllis =

Scientific classification
- Kingdom: Animalia
- Phylum: Arthropoda
- Class: Insecta
- Order: Coleoptera
- Suborder: Polyphaga
- Infraorder: Staphyliniformia
- Family: Leiodidae
- Tribe: Agathidiini
- Genus: Amphicyllis; Erichson, 1845

Genus of beetles

Amphicyllis is a genus of beetles belonging to the family Leiodidae.

The genus was first described by Wilhelm Ferdinand Erichson in 1845.

The species of this genus are found in Europe.

Species:

- Amphicyllis globiformis
- Amphicyllis globus
