= Anisotoma blanchardi =

Scientific classification
- Domain: Eukaryota
- Kingdom: Animalia
- Phylum: Arthropoda
- Class: Insecta
- Order: Coleoptera
- Suborder: Polyphaga
- Infraorder: Staphyliniformia
- Family: Leiodidae
- Genus: Anisotoma
- Species: A. blanchardi

Binomial name
- Anisotoma blanchardi (Horn, 1880)

Species of beetle

Anisotoma blanchardi is a species of round fungus beetle in the family Leiodidae. It is found in North America. It feeds on slime molds such as Lycogala epidendrum and multiple species of Stemonitis.
