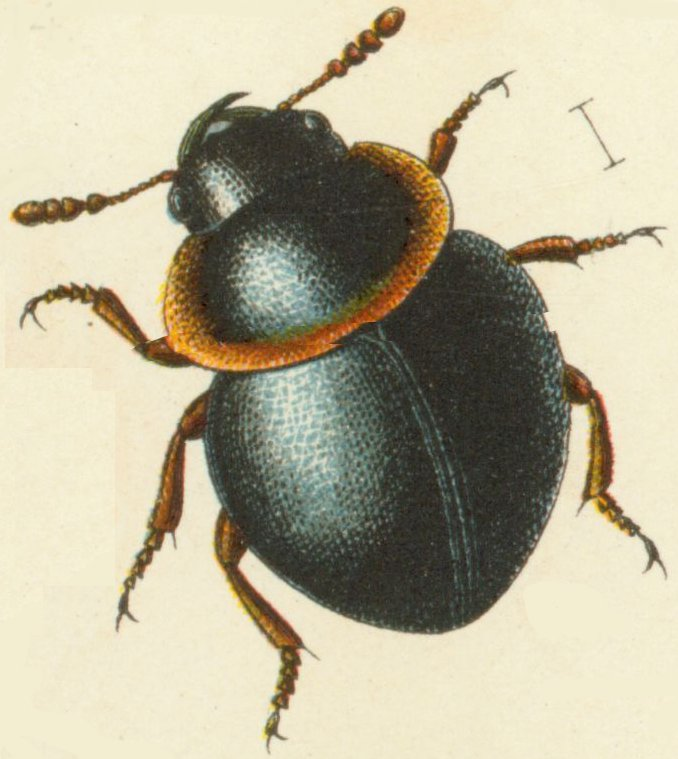

Scientific classification
- Domain: Eukaryota
- Kingdom: Animalia
- Phylum: Arthropoda
- Class: Insecta
- Order: Coleoptera
- Suborder: Polyphaga
- Infraorder: Staphyliniformia
- Family: Leiodidae
- Genus: Agathidium
- Species: A. mandibulare

Binomial name
- Agathidium mandibulare Sturm, 1807

= Agathidium mandibulare =

Species of beetle

Agathidium mandibulare is a species of round fungus beetle in the family Leiodidae.
