= F. Franklin Moon =

American academic and forester

Frederick Franklin Moon
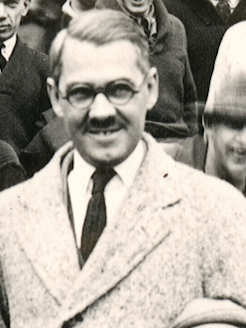
- Moon c. 1922.
- Born: July 3, 1880; Easton, Pennsylvania
- Died: September 3, 1929 (aged 49); Syracuse, New York
- Spouse: Marion B. Moon

Frederick Franklin Moon (July 3, 1880 – September 3, 1929) was a forester, and head of the New York State College of Forestry at Syracuse University from 1920-27.

== Early life and education ==
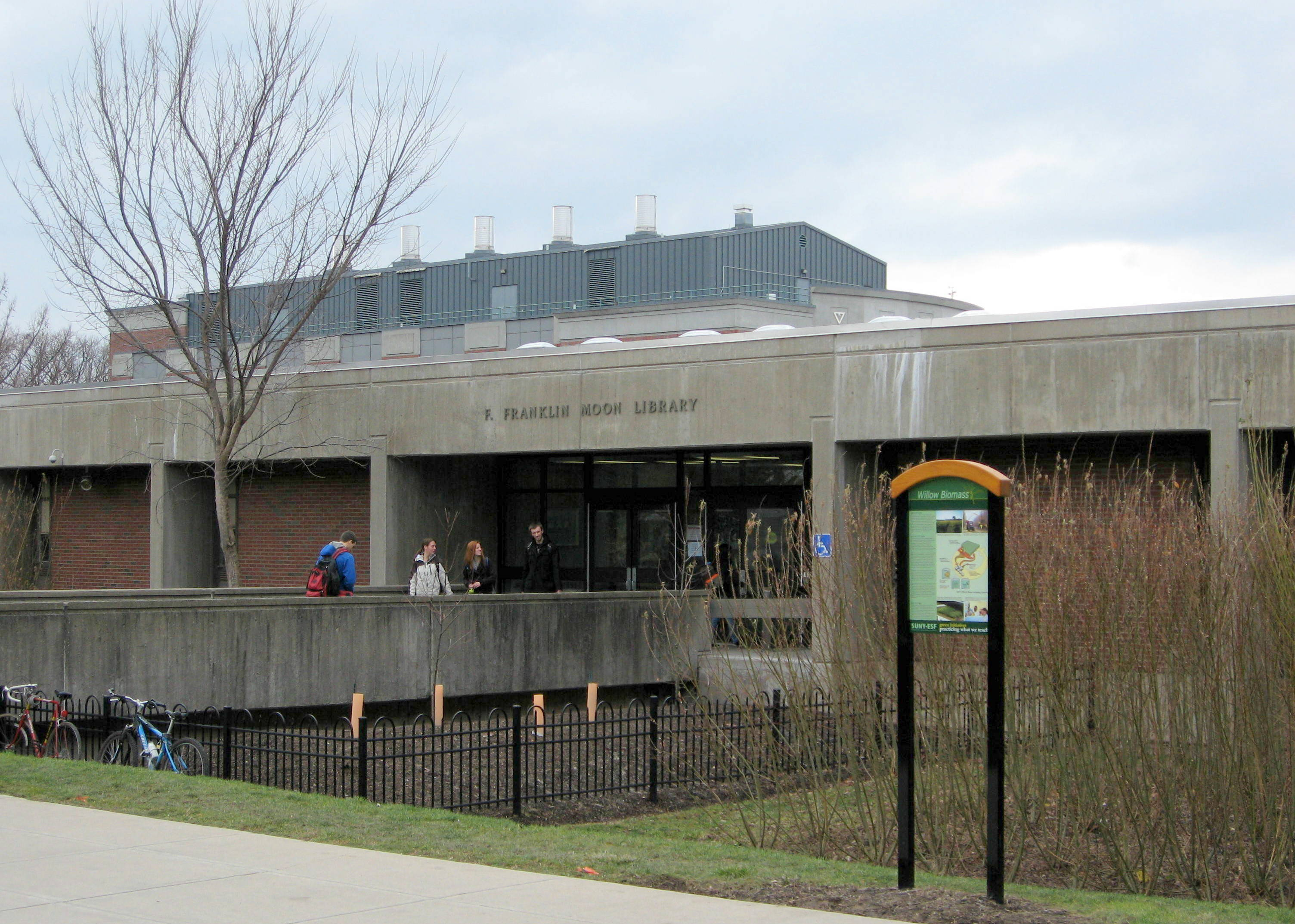
F. Franklin Moon Library, SUNY-ESF, Syracuse, New York

Moon born in Easton, Pennsylvania, on July 3, 1880, to William White and Ophelia Frances Nightingale Moon. He attended Amherst College (B.A., 1901), spent two years conducting postgraduate work at Harvard University (1902 to 1904), before attending Yale University (M.F., 1909).

== Career ==
After graduation Moon worked for governmental forestry organizations for several years, including a year in Kentucky working for the United States Forest Service followed by approximately a year and a half working for New York State in the Hudson forest reservation.

From 1912-20, Moon was Professor of Forest Engineering at the New York State College of Forestry at Syracuse University. In 1920 Moon became a Professor of Silviculture. He served as Acting Dean of the College from 1917 to 1918 while Dean Hugh P. Baker was in the Army. In 1920 Moon was named Dean of the College after Baker resigned.

He was a member of the American Forestry Association, the Society of American Foresters, the American Association for the Advancement of Science, and was the delegate for the World Congress of Forestry in 1926.

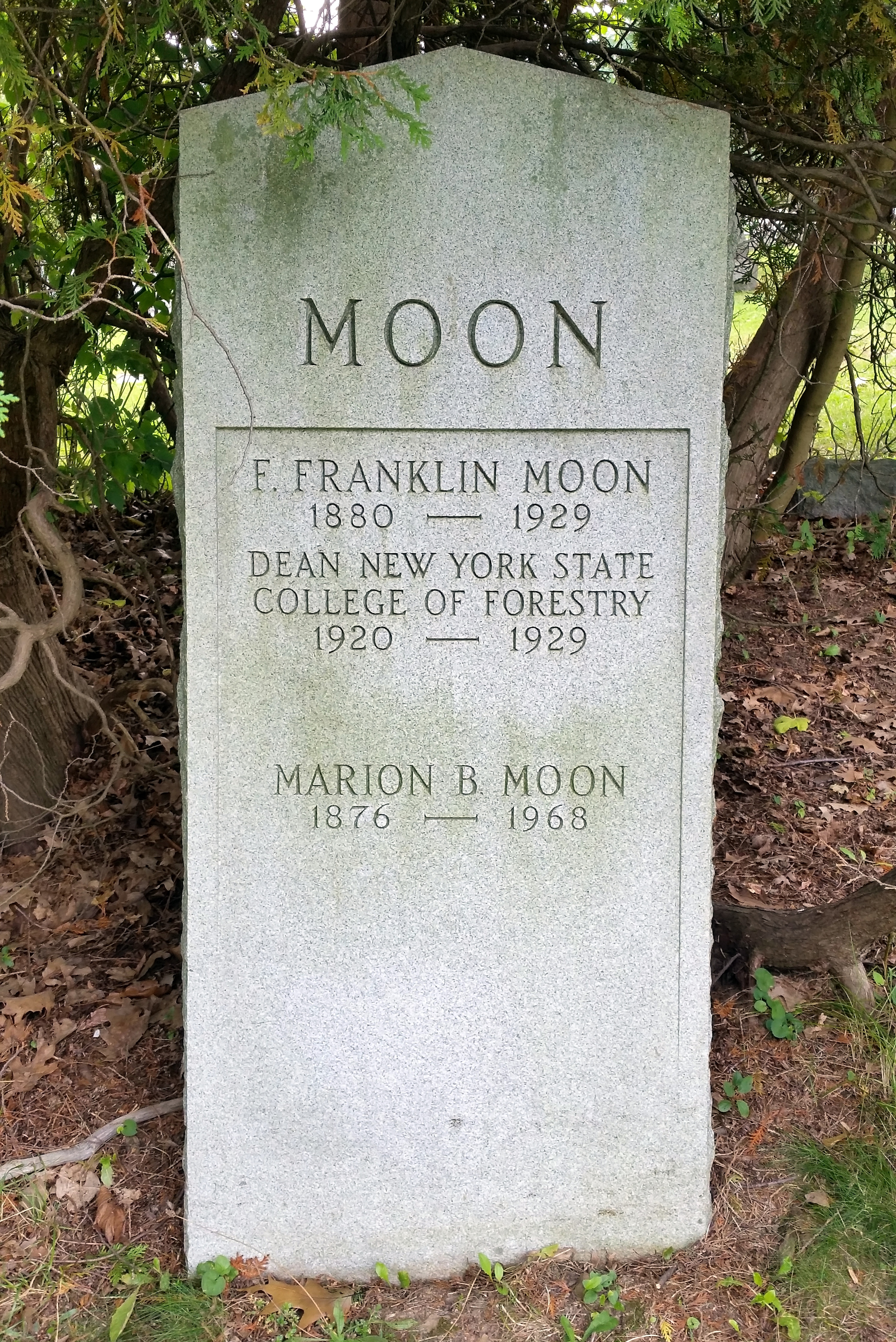
Gravestone of F. Franklin and Marion B. Moon, Oakwood Cemetery, Syracuse, New York

== End of life ==
Moon died on September 3, 1929. Moon is buried in Oakwood Cemetery - adjacent to the SUNY College of Environmental Science and Forestry campus. His headstone overlooks the campus.

== Key works ==
Moon wrote several books, including Elements of Forestry, and The Book of Forestry.

== Legacy ==
In 1933 the library for the SUNY College of Environmental Science and Forestry was moved to Marshall Hall on the SUNY ESF campus and it was renamed the Moon Memorial Library. In 1968 the library moved to a new location.

== See also ==
- History of the New York State College of Forestry

Academic offices
| Preceded by Hugh P. Baker | Dean of the New York State College of Forestry; 1920 - 1927 | Succeeded by Nelson C. Brown |
