= Anisotoma geminata =

Scientific classification
- Domain: Eukaryota
- Kingdom: Animalia
- Phylum: Arthropoda
- Class: Insecta
- Order: Coleoptera
- Suborder: Polyphaga
- Infraorder: Staphyliniformia
- Family: Leiodidae
- Genus: Anisotoma
- Species: A. geminata

Binomial name
- Anisotoma geminata (Horn, 1880)

Species of beetle

Anisotoma geminata is a species of round fungus beetle in the family Leiodidae. It is found in North America.
