= Edwin C. Jahn =

Edwin C. Jahn (September 6, 1902 – June 13, 2001) was Dean of the State University of New York College of Environmental Science and Forestry at Syracuse University from 1967 to 1969. He received his B.S. cum laude (1925) and M.S. (1926) from the New York State College of Forestry; and his Ph.D. in Organic Chemistry (1929) from McGill University.

Academic offices
Preceded by Hardy L. Shirley	Dean of the New York State College of Forestry; 1967 - 1969	Succeeded by Edward E. Palmer
