= Agathidium akrogeneios =

Scientific classification
- Domain: Eukaryota
- Kingdom: Animalia
- Phylum: Arthropoda
- Class: Insecta
- Order: Coleoptera
- Suborder: Polyphaga
- Infraorder: Staphyliniformia
- Family: Leiodidae
- Genus: Agathidium
- Species: A. akrogeneios

Binomial name
- Agathidium akrogeneios Miller and Wheeler, 2005

Species of beetle

Agathidium akrogeneios is a species of round fungus beetle in the family Leiodidae. It is found in North America. This species is similar to other A. dentigerum subgroup members that have a large, acute, falcate male metafemoral tooth, very narrow metasternum with the oblique metasternal carinae relatively prominent and meeting medially in a large, posteriorly directed triangular lobe, large male metasternal fovea, and reduced eyes.
