= Cornelius B. Murphy Jr. =

American environmental engineer and professor

Cornelius ("Neil") B. Murphy Jr. is Professor of Environmental and Sustainable Systems at the State University of New York College of Environmental Science and Forestry (SUNY-ESF). From 2000 to 2013, he was the third President of SUNY-ESF. Previously, he was president and chief executive officer of O'Brien & Gere, a large environmental engineering consulting firm based in Syracuse, New York. He has a Ph.D. in Chemistry from Syracuse University, and a B.A. in Chemistry from Saint Michael's College.

Academic offices
Preceded by Ross S. Whaley	President of SUNY Environmental Science & Forestry; 2000 - 2013	Succeeded by Quentin D. Wheeler
