= Nelson C. Brown =

American forester

- Born: Nelson Courtlandt Brown; March 1, 1885; South Orange, New Jersey, U.S.
- Education: Yale University (BA)
- Occupation: Forester

Nelson Courtlandt Brown (born March 1, 1885) was an American forester.

== Early life ==
Brown was born on March 1, 1985, in South Orange, New Jersey. He graduated from Yale University with a bachelors of Arts degree in 1906 and a Master of Forestry degree in 1908.

== Early career ==
He was with the U.S. Forest Service working mainly in the northwest and the south (1908–1912). Brown was appointed assistant professor of Forest Utilization at the New York State College of Forestry, Syracuse, New York, on July 1, 1912, and appointed to Professor in 1914. He first taught the fundamental forestry subjects and later became head of the Department of Forest Utilization.

== Wartime service ==
Brown resigned on August 31, 1917, to take up duties as the US Federal Trade Commissioner in Europe. In 1918, he was transferred to the American Expeditionary Force as adviser in forest products and utilization.

== Return to New York ==
Brown was reappointed Professor of Forest Utilization at the New York State College of Forestry on August 1, 1921. When F. Franklin Moon became Dean, Brown served in Moon's administration. When Moon was on sabbatical leave from 1926 to 1927, Brown served as Acting Dean. Upon Moon's death, Brown again was appointed Acting Dean. Brown served as Acting Dean three times in his career: 1926–1927; 1928; and 1929–1930.

In his first administration, Brown secured the gift of the Charles Lathrop Pack Demonstration Forest and a cash donation for the forest's preliminary development. In his second administration, he secured the state appropriation for the campus's second building, what became Louis Marshall Memorial Hall (Marshall Hall), which offered greater teaching and laboratory space. Brown also procured the only substantial increases in state appropriations for teaching staff salaries as well as a grant of $10,000 for forest investigations.

== Scientific contributions ==
Brown co-authored Elements of Forestry with F. Franklin Moon. Other texts included Forest Products and Their Manufacture (1919), America's Lumber Industry (1923), Logging - Principles and Practice (1934), General Forestry (1935), and Logging Transportation (1936). Brown also authored articles on the economic and practical phases of lumber production, manufacture, and consumption for technical and trade journals.

Academic offices
Preceded by F. Franklin Moon	Acting Dean, New York State College of Forestry; 1926 - 1927; 1928; and 1929 - 1930	Succeeded by Hugh P. Baker
