= Anisotoma inops =

Scientific classification
- Domain: Eukaryota
- Kingdom: Animalia
- Phylum: Arthropoda
- Class: Insecta
- Order: Coleoptera
- Suborder: Polyphaga
- Infraorder: Staphyliniformia
- Family: Leiodidae
- Genus: Anisotoma
- Species: A. inops

Binomial name
- Anisotoma inops Brown, 1937

Species of beetle

Anisotoma inops is a species of round fungus beetle in the family Leiodidae. It is found in North America.
