= Agathidium pulchrum =

Scientific classification
- Kingdom: Animalia
- Phylum: Arthropoda
- Clade: Pancrustacea
- Class: Insecta
- Order: Coleoptera
- Suborder: Polyphaga
- Infraorder: Staphyliniformia
- Family: Leiodidae
- Genus: Agathidium
- Species: A. pulchrum

Binomial name
- Agathidium pulchrum LeConte, 1853

Species of beetle

Agathidium pulchrum is a species of round fungus beetle in the family Leiodidae. It is found in North America.
