= Anisotoma globososa =

Scientific classification
- Domain: Eukaryota
- Kingdom: Animalia
- Phylum: Arthropoda
- Class: Insecta
- Order: Coleoptera
- Suborder: Polyphaga
- Infraorder: Staphyliniformia
- Family: Leiodidae
- Genus: Anisotoma
- Species: A. globososa

Binomial name
- Anisotoma globososa Hatch, 1929

Species of beetle

Anisotoma globososa is a species of round fungus beetle in the family Leiodidae. It is found in North America.
