= Gelae parile =

Scientific classification
- Domain: Eukaryota
- Kingdom: Animalia
- Phylum: Arthropoda
- Class: Insecta
- Order: Coleoptera
- Suborder: Polyphaga
- Infraorder: Staphyliniformia
- Family: Leiodidae
- Genus: Gelae
- Species: G. parile

Binomial name
- Gelae parile (Fall, 1934)

Synonyms
- Agathidium parile Fall, 1934

Species of beetle

Gelae parile is a species of round fungus beetle in the family Leiodidae. It is found in North America.
