= Agathidium bushi =

Scientific classification
- Kingdom: Animalia
- Phylum: Arthropoda
- Class: Insecta
- Order: Coleoptera
- Suborder: Polyphaga
- Infraorder: Staphyliniformia
- Family: Leiodidae
- Genus: Agathidium
- Species: A. bushi

Binomial name
- Agathidium bushi Miller, K.B. & Q.D.Wheeler, 2005

Species of beetle

Agathidium bushi is a species of round fungus beetle in the family Leiodidae, found in North America. The specific name bushi honours George W. Bush.
