= Agathidium rubellum =

Scientific classification
- Domain: Eukaryota
- Kingdom: Animalia
- Phylum: Arthropoda
- Class: Insecta
- Order: Coleoptera
- Suborder: Polyphaga
- Infraorder: Staphyliniformia
- Family: Leiodidae
- Genus: Agathidium
- Species: A. rubellum

Binomial name
- Agathidium rubellum Fall, 1934

Species of beetle

Agathidium rubellum is a species of round fungus beetle in the family Leiodidae. It is found in North America.
