= Agathidium pulchellum =

Conservation status
- Endangered (IUCN 3.1)

Scientific classification
- Kingdom: Animalia
- Phylum: Arthropoda
- Clade: Pancrustacea
- Class: Insecta
- Order: Coleoptera
- Suborder: Polyphaga
- Infraorder: Staphyliniformia
- Family: Leiodidae
- Genus: Agathidium
- Species: A. pulchellum

Binomial name
- Agathidium pulchellum Wankowicz, 1869

Species of round fungus beetle

Agathidium pulchellum is a species of round fungus beetle in the family Leiodidae. This species is one of the rarest of the genus Agathidium. It feeds exclusively on a slime mold species named Trichia decipens with mid-decayed aspen, spruce and birch logs in boreal forests. It is found only in natural forests where there is a ratio of at least 80 aspen and spruce logs per hectare. It was first discovered in 1971 in Blåkölen in Norrbotten, Sweden. A. pulchellum is considered an endangered species in Sweden, and Finland.
