= Agathidium mollinum =

Scientific classification
- Domain: Eukaryota
- Kingdom: Animalia
- Phylum: Arthropoda
- Class: Insecta
- Order: Coleoptera
- Suborder: Polyphaga
- Infraorder: Staphyliniformia
- Family: Leiodidae
- Genus: Agathidium
- Species: A. mollinum

Binomial name
- Agathidium mollinum Fall, 1934

Species of beetle

Agathidium mollinum is a species of round fungus beetle in the family Leiodidae. It is found in North America.
