= Agathidium difforme =

Scientific classification
- Domain: Eukaryota
- Kingdom: Animalia
- Phylum: Arthropoda
- Class: Insecta
- Order: Coleoptera
- Suborder: Polyphaga
- Infraorder: Staphyliniformia
- Family: Leiodidae
- Genus: Agathidium
- Species: A. difforme

Binomial name
- Agathidium difforme (LeConte, 1850)

Species of beetle

Agathidium difforme is a species of round fungus beetle in the family Leiodidae. It is found in North America.
