= Agathidium vaderi =

Scientific classification
- Domain: Eukaryota
- Kingdom: Animalia
- Phylum: Arthropoda
- Class: Insecta
- Order: Coleoptera
- Suborder: Polyphaga
- Infraorder: Staphyliniformia
- Family: Leiodidae
- Genus: Agathidium
- Species: A. vaderi

Binomial name
- Agathidium vaderi Miller, K.B. & Q.D.Wheeler, 2005

Species of beetle

Agathidium vaderi is a species of round fungus beetle in the family Leiodidae. It is found in North America. The beetle was named after the fictional character Darth Vader by Cornell University entomologists due to its shiny helmetlike head that resembles that of the Star Wars villain.

== Range ==
Agathidium vaderi has been observed in the mountains of western North Carolina, eastern Tennessee, and northern Georgia, including the Great Smoky Mountains.
