= Agathidium cheneyi =

Scientific classification
- Kingdom: Animalia
- Phylum: Arthropoda
- Clade: Pancrustacea
- Class: Insecta
- Order: Coleoptera
- Suborder: Polyphaga
- Infraorder: Staphyliniformia
- Family: Leiodidae
- Genus: Agathidium
- Species: A. cheneyi

Binomial name
- Agathidium cheneyi Miller, K.B. & Q.D.Wheeler, 2005

Species of beetle

Agathidium cheneyi is a slime-mold beetle of the Leiodidae family. The species is known from a collection obtained in Chiapas, Mexico

It was named after the former US vice President Dick Cheney by two researchers at Cornell University, one of sixty five newly described species that emerged from a review of several large museum collections of slime-mold beetles of the genus Agathidium. Along with taxa named for Donald Rumsfeld and George W. Bush, the entomologists stated that these epithets were a homage to these members of the US government rather than any specific resemblance.
