= Abacetus alesi =

Scientific classification
- Kingdom: Animalia
- Phylum: Arthropoda
- Class: Insecta
- Order: Coleoptera
- Suborder: Adephaga
- Family: Carabidae
- Genus: Abacetus
- Species: A. alesi

Binomial name
- Abacetus alesi Jedlicka, 1936

Species of beetle

Abacetus alesi is a species of ground beetle in the subfamily Pterostichinae. It was described by Jedlicka in 1936 and is found in Indonesia and Philippines.
