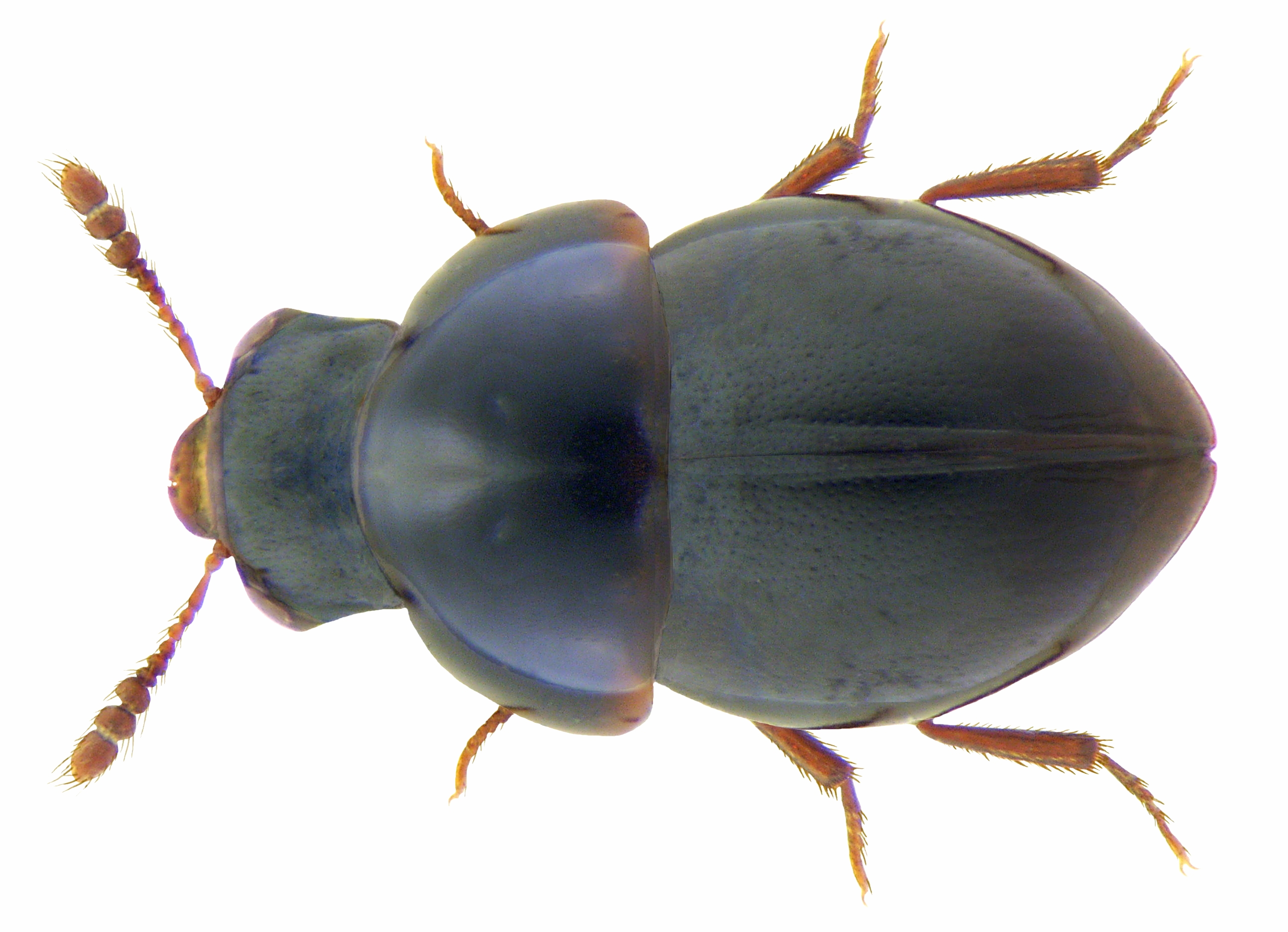

Scientific classification
- Kingdom: Animalia
- Phylum: Arthropoda
- Clade: Pancrustacea
- Class: Insecta
- Order: Coleoptera
- Suborder: Polyphaga
- Infraorder: Staphyliniformia
- Family: Leiodidae
- Genus: Agathidium
- Species: A. atrum

Binomial name
- Agathidium atrum (Paykull, 1798)

Synonyms
- Agathidium rucolle Fleischer, A., 1932; Agathidium rufipes Stephens, 1835; Agathidium rufobrunnea Roubal, 1948; Sphaeridium atrum Paykull, 1798

= Agathidium atrum =

Species of beetle

Agathidium atrum is a species of round fungus beetles in the family Leiodidae. It is black with the sides of the thorax, legs and antenna brown. It is found in Europe, Russia (European, Siberia, Far East), Armenia, Azerbaijan, Georgia, Turkey and Iran.
