= Hugh P. Baker =

American academic administrator (1878–1950)

Hugh Potter Baker
- Hugh P. Baker c. 1938

President of Massachusetts State College (now the University of Massachusetts Amherst)
- In office 1933–1947

Dean of the New York State College of Forestry at Syracuse University
- In office 1912–1920

Personal details
- Born: January 20, 1878 St. Croix Falls, Wisconsin, U.S.
- Died: May 24, 1950 (aged 72) Orlando, Florida, U.S.
- Spouse(s): Fleta Paddock 1904–1928; Richarda Sahla 1929–1950
- Education: Michigan Agricultural College (B.S.); Yale University (M.F.); Ludwig-Maximilians-Universität München (D.Oec.)

Hugh Potter Baker (January 20, 1878 – May 24, 1950) was a graduate of the Michigan State College of Agriculture; Yale's School of Forestry (M.F., 1904); and the Ludwig-Maximilians-Universität München (Ph.D., Economics, 1910). He was the second and fourth Dean of the New York State College of Forestry at Syracuse University, from 1912 to 1920 and 1930 to 1933.

Baker previously had worked with Gifford Pinchot at the United States Bureau of Forestry and Forest Service (1901–04). Immediately before coming to Syracuse, Baker was Professor of Forestry at the Pennsylvania State College.

After his second stint as Dean of the College of Forestry, Baker went on to become President of Massachusetts State College (1933–47), presently known as the University of Massachusetts Amherst.

== Selected works ==
- "The Prairie Farmer and Forestry" (1907)
- "Some Forestry Problems of the Prairies of the Middle West" (1908)
- "Native and Planted Timber of Iowa" (1908)
- "Forestry and Its Relation to Horticulture" (1908)
- "Why Pennsylvania Needs Forestry" Forest Leaves, Vol. XII (1909)
- "The Third Conservation Congress Held at Kansas City, Missouri" (1911)
- "Syracuse University and the City of Syracuse" (1914)
- "Forestry and Reconstruction in New York" (1919)
- "The Manufacture of Pulp and Paper as an American Industry" (1920)
- "Fundamental Silvicultural Measures Necessary to Insure Forest Lands Remaining Reasonably Productive After Logging", co-authored by Edward F. McCarthy, Journal of Forestry, Vol. XVIII (1920)

== Honors ==
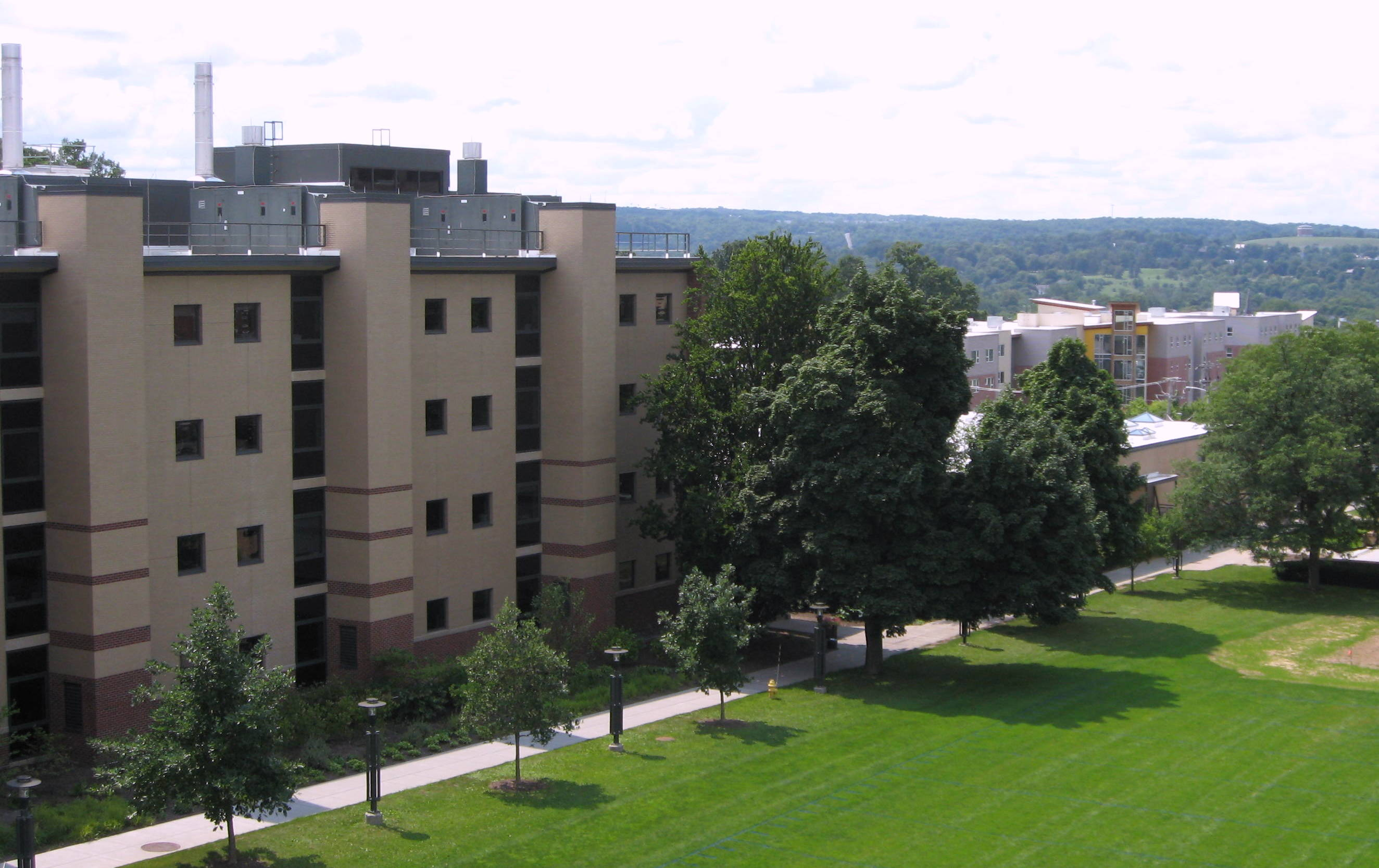
Baker Laboratory, SUNY-ESF, Syracuse, New York

- A dormitory at the University of Massachusetts Amherst, Baker Hall, is named in his honor.
- Baker Laboratory (formally, the Hugh P. Baker Memorial Laboratory) at the State University of New York College of Environmental Science and Forestry, successor to the New York State College of Forestry at Syracuse University, is named after him.

Academic offices
Preceded by William L. Bray	Dean of the New York State College of Forestry; 1912 - 1920	Succeeded by F. Franklin Moon
Preceded by Nelson C. Brown	Dean of the New York State College of Forestry; 1930 - 1933	Succeeded by Samuel N. Spring
Preceded by Roscoe Wilfred Thatcher	President of Massachusetts State College; 1933 - 1947	Succeeded by Ralph Van Meter
