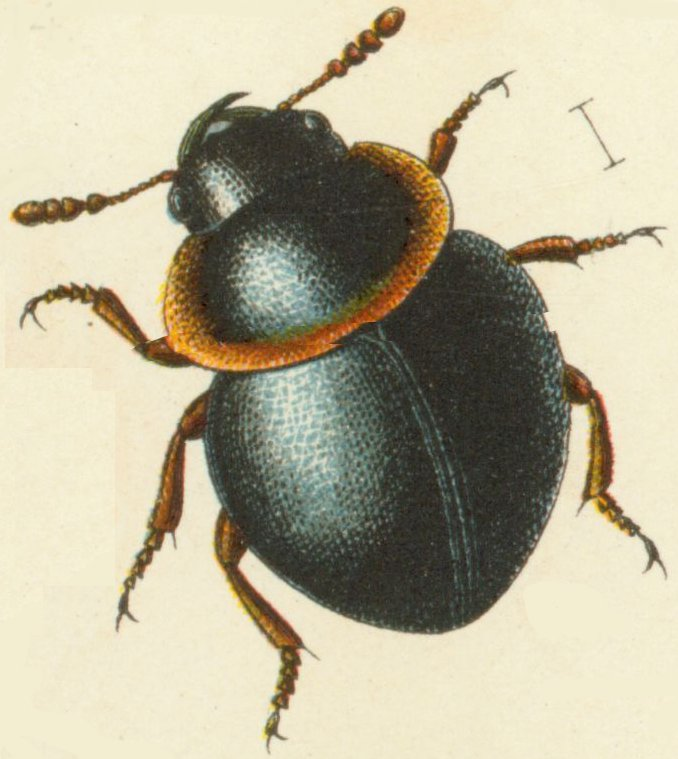
- Agathidium mandibulare

Scientific classification
- Kingdom: Animalia
- Phylum: Arthropoda
- Clade: Pancrustacea
- Class: Insecta
- Order: Coleoptera
- Suborder: Polyphaga
- Infraorder: Staphyliniformia
- Family: Leiodidae
- Tribe: Agathidiini
- Genus: Agathidium; Panzer, 1797

= Agathidium =

Genus of beetles

Agathidium varians

Agathidium is a genus of beetles in the family Leiodidae.

A. bushi, A. cheneyi and A. rumsfeldi are species of this genus named after George W. Bush, Dick Cheney and Donald Rumsfeld, respectively, by two former Cornell entomologists, Kelly B. Miller (now at the University of New Mexico) and Quentin D. Wheeler. According to Miller and Wheeler, the naming of the beetles (which were three of 65 species to be named) was done in homage to the political figures. The same authors named A. vaderi after the fictional Darth Vader.

Some species can roll themselves up into an almost complete sphere, similar to pillbugs. Some males have horns on their left mandibles to dislodge rival males.

== Species ==
- Agathidium akallebregma Miller and Wheeler, 2005
- Agathidium akrogeneios Miller and Wheeler, 2005
- Agathidium amae Miller and Wheeler, 2005
- Agathidium angulare Mannerheim, 1852
- Agathidium angustoperculum Wheeler and Miller, 2005
- Agathidium appalachium Miller and Wheeler, 2005
- Agathidium aristerium Wheeler, 1987
- Agathidium athabascanum Fall, 1934
- Agathidium atronitens Fall, 1934
- Agathidium atrum Paykull, 1798
- Agathidium brevisternum Fall, 1934
- Agathidium bushi Miller and Wheeler, 2005
- Agathidium carolinense Miller and Wheeler, 2005
- Agathidium cavisternum Fall, 1934
- Agathidium cheneyi Miller and Wheeler, 2005
- Agathidium columbianum Fall, 1934
- Agathidium compressidens Fall, 1934
- Agathidium concinnum Mannerheim, 1852
- Agathidium conjunctum Brown, 1933
- Agathidium cortezi Miller and Wheeler, 2005
- Agathidium dentigerum Horn, 1880
- Agathidium depressum Fall, 1934
- Agathidium difforme (LeConte, 1850)
- Agathidium dioperculum Wheeler and Miller, 2005
- Agathidium divaricatum Miller and Wheeler, 2005
- Agathidium dubitanoides Wheeler and Miller, 2005
- Agathidium dubitans Fall, 1934
- Agathidium estriatum Horn, 1880
- Agathidium exiguum Melsheimer, 1844
- Agathidium falcatoperculum Wheeler and Miller, 2005
- Agathidium fawcettae Miller and Wheeler, 2005
- Agathidium fenderi Hatch, 1957
- Agathidium framea Miller and Wheeler, 2005
- Agathidium gallititillo Miller and Wheeler, 2005
- Agathidium georgiaense Miller and Wheeler, 2005
- Agathidium hamulum Miller and Wheeler, 2005
- Agathidium hatchi Wheeler, 1977
- Agathidium integricolle Wollaston, 1864
- Agathidium jasperanum Fall, 1934
- Agathidium kimberlae Miller and Wheeler, 2005
- Agathidium laetum Fall, 1934
- Agathidium maculosum Brown, 1928
- Agathidium mandibulare Sturm, 1807
- Agathidium marae Miller and Wheeler, 2005
- Agathidium mollinum Fall, 1934
- Agathidium omissum Fall, 1934
- Agathidium oniscoides Palisot de Beauvois, 1817
- Agathidium oregonense Miller and Wheeler, 2005
- Agathidium picipes Fall, 1934
- Agathidium pocahontasae Miller and Wheeler, 2005
- Agathidium politum LeConte, 1866
- Agathidium pulchellum Wankowicz, 1869
- Agathidium pulchrum LeConte, 1853
- Agathidium repentinum Horn, 1880
- Agathidium revolvens LeConte, 1850
- Agathidium rhinocerellum Wheeler and Miller, 2005
- Agathidium rotundulum Mannerheim, 1852
- Agathidium rubellum Fall, 1934
- Agathidium rumsfeldi Miller and Wheeler, 2005
- Agathidium rusticum Fall, 1934
- Agathidium sexstriatum Horn, 1880
- Agathidium stephani Miller and Wheeler, 2005
- Agathidium vaderi Miller and Wheeler, 2005
- Agathidium vesperpressidens Miller and Wheeler, 2005
- Agathidium virile Fall, 1901
