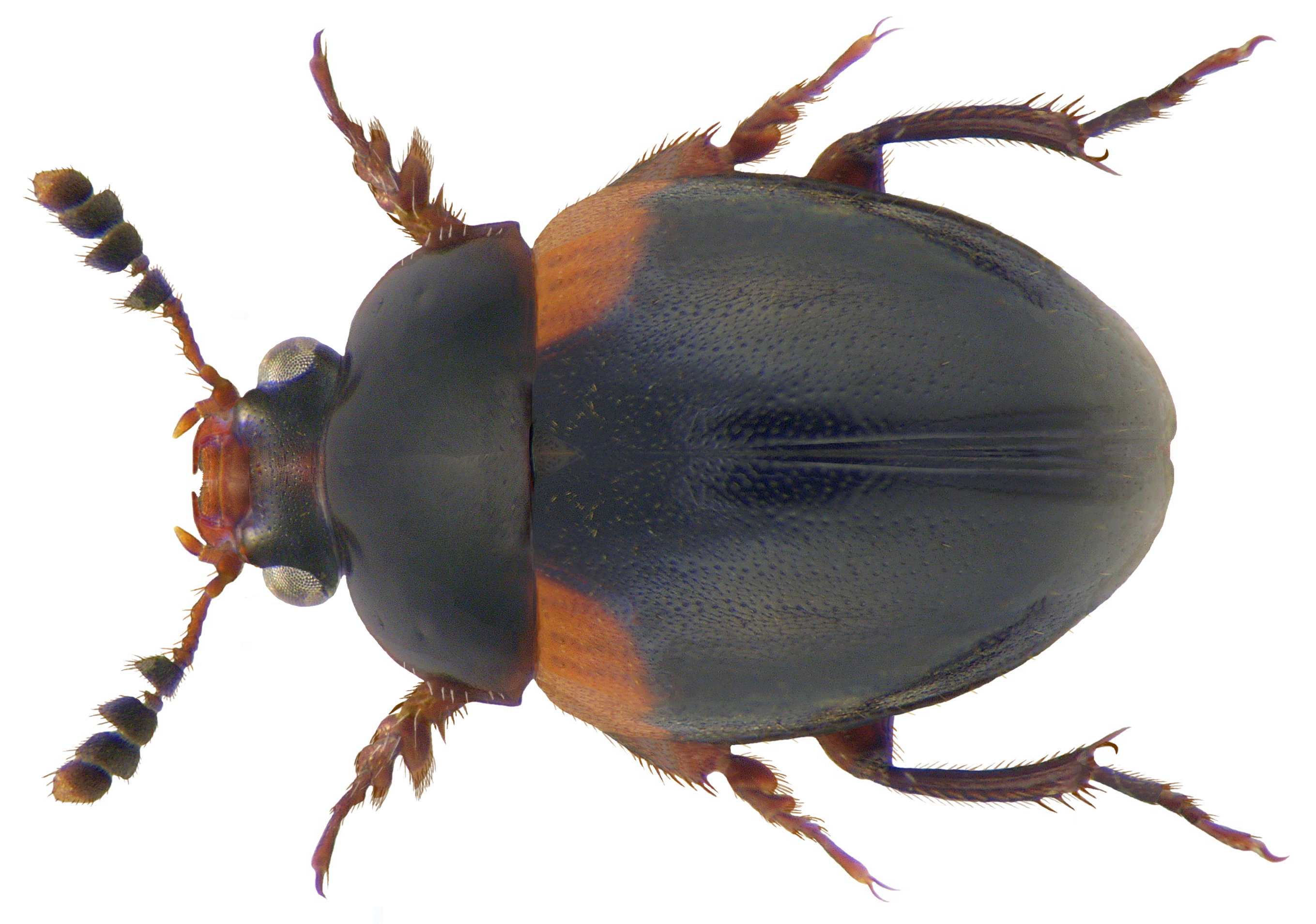
- Anisotoma humeralis

Scientific classification
- Domain: Eukaryota
- Kingdom: Animalia
- Phylum: Arthropoda
- Class: Insecta
- Order: Coleoptera
- Suborder: Polyphaga
- Infraorder: Staphyliniformia
- Family: Leiodidae
- Tribe: Agathidiini
- Genus: Anisotoma; Panzer, 1797

= Anisotoma (beetle) =

Genus of beetles

Anisotoma is a genus of round fungus beetles in the family Leiodidae. There are at least 20 described species in Anisotoma.

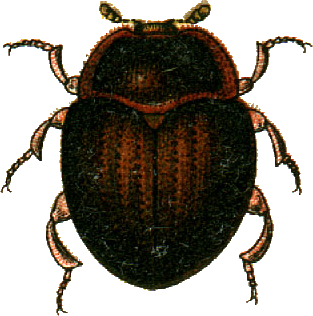
Anisotoma orbicularis

== Species ==
These 22 species belong to the genus Anisotoma:

- Anisotoma amica Brown, 1937^{i g b}
- Anisotoma axillaris Gyllenhal, 1810^{g}
- Anisotoma basalis (LeConte, 1853)^{i g}
- Anisotoma bifoveata Wheeler, 1979^{i g}
- Anisotoma blanchardi (Horn, 1880)^{i g b}
- Anisotoma castanea (Herbst, 1792)^{g}
- Anisotoma confusa (Horn, 1880)^{i g}
- Anisotoma discolor (Melsheimer, 1844)^{i g b}
- Anisotoma errans Brown, 1937^{i g b}
- Anisotoma expolita Brown, 1937^{i g}
- Anisotoma geminata (Horn, 1880)^{i g b}
- Anisotoma glabra (Kugelann, 1794)^{g}
- Anisotoma globososa Hatch, 1929^{i g b}
- Anisotoma horni (Horn, 1880)^{b}
- Anisotoma humeralis (Fabricius, 1792)^{i g b}
- Anisotoma inops Brown, 1937^{i g b}
- Anisotoma nevadensis Brown, 1937^{i g}
- Anisotoma obsoleta (Horn, 1880)^{i g}
- Anisotoma orbicularis (Herbst, 1792)^{i g}
- Anisotoma reticulonota Wheeler, 1979^{i g}
- Anisotoma smetanai Angelini & Marzo, 1995^{g}
- Anisotoma tenulucida Wheeler, 1979^{i g}

Data sources: i = ITIS, c = Catalogue of Life, g = GBIF, b = Bugguide.net
