= Samuel N. Spring =

- Born: February 5, 1875; Sioux City, Iowa
- Died: February 3, 1952 (aged 76); Atlanta, Georgia

Samuel Newton Spring (February 5, 1875 in Sioux City, Iowa – February 3, 1952 in Atlanta, Georgia) attended Yale University, receiving his A.B. degree in 1898; and M.F. degree in 1903 from the Yale School of Forestry after service in the Bureau of Forestry, predecessor to the USFS.

Spring was the first Professor of Forestry and department chair at the University of Maine from 1903 to 1905. In 1905, he resigned to return to the USFS as Chief of the Office of Forest Extension. In 1909 he was appointed State Forester of Connecticut and lecturer at the Yale School of Forestry. From 1912 - 1933, Spring was Professor of Silviculture in the Department of Forestry within the New York State College of Agriculture at Cornell University.

In February 1933, Spring was appointed Dean of the New York State College of Forestry at Syracuse University, succeeding Hugh P. Baker who had been elected President of what was to become the University of Massachusetts at Amherst. Spring was Dean of the College of Forestry from 1933 until his retirement in 1944. On his retirement in May 1944, Syracuse University conferred upon him the honorary degree of Doctor of Laws (LL.D.); he was henceforth known as Dr. Samuel N. Spring.

He died February 3, 1952, in Atlanta, Georgia, at age 77.

== See also ==
- Charles A. Spring
