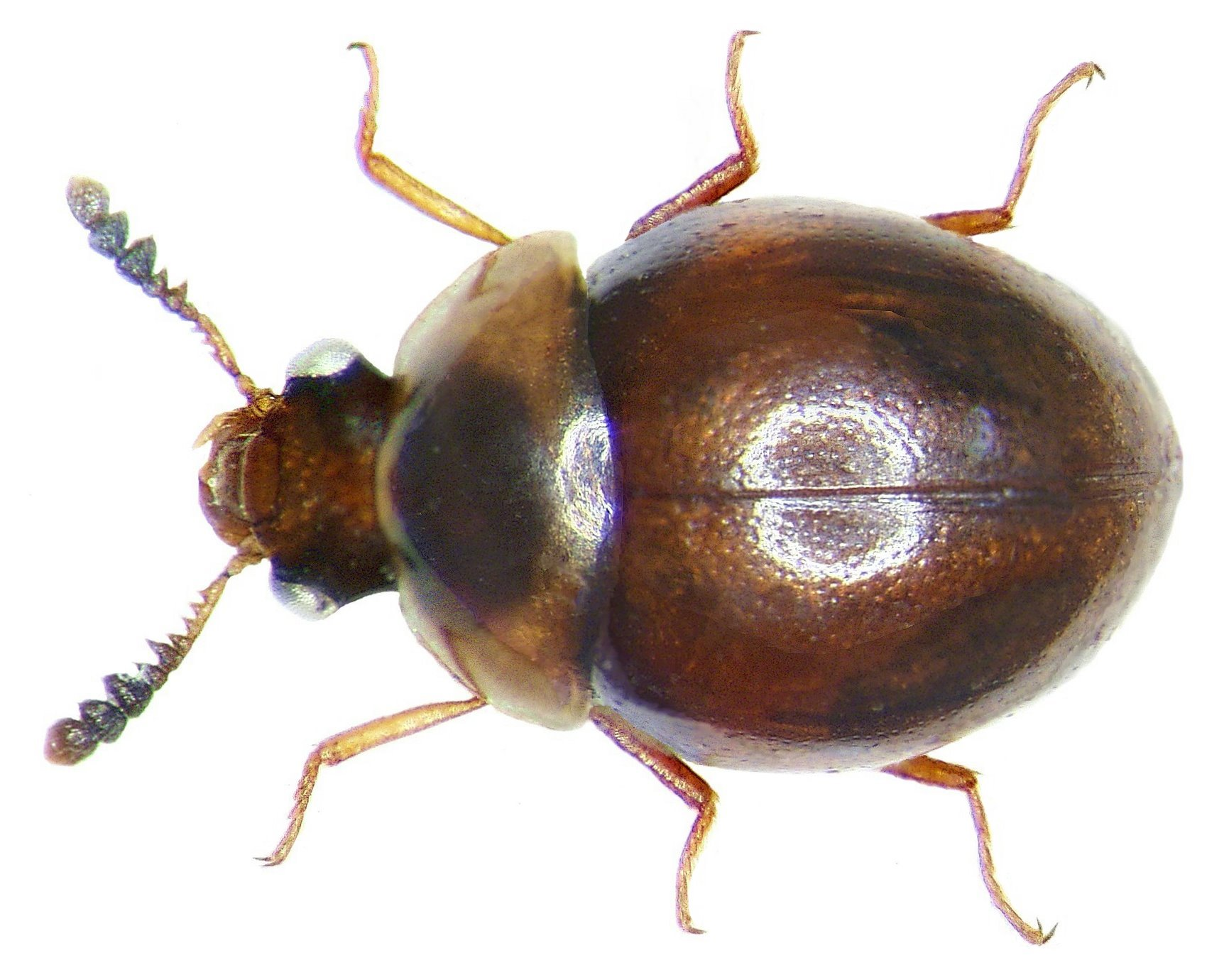
- Liodopria, a genus of beetles

Scientific classification
- Kingdom: Animalia
- Phylum: Arthropoda
- Class: Insecta
- Order: Coleoptera
- Suborder: Polyphaga
- Infraorder: Staphyliniformia
- Family: Leiodidae
- Genus: Liodopria; Reitter, 1909

= Liodopria =

Genus of beetles

Liodopria is a genus of beetles belonging to the family Leiodidae.

The species of this genus are found in Europe.

Species:

- Liodopria cambogensis Angelini & De Marzo, 1984
- Liodopria hlavaci Angelini & Cooter, 2002
