= Quentin D. Wheeler =

American entomologist (born 1954)

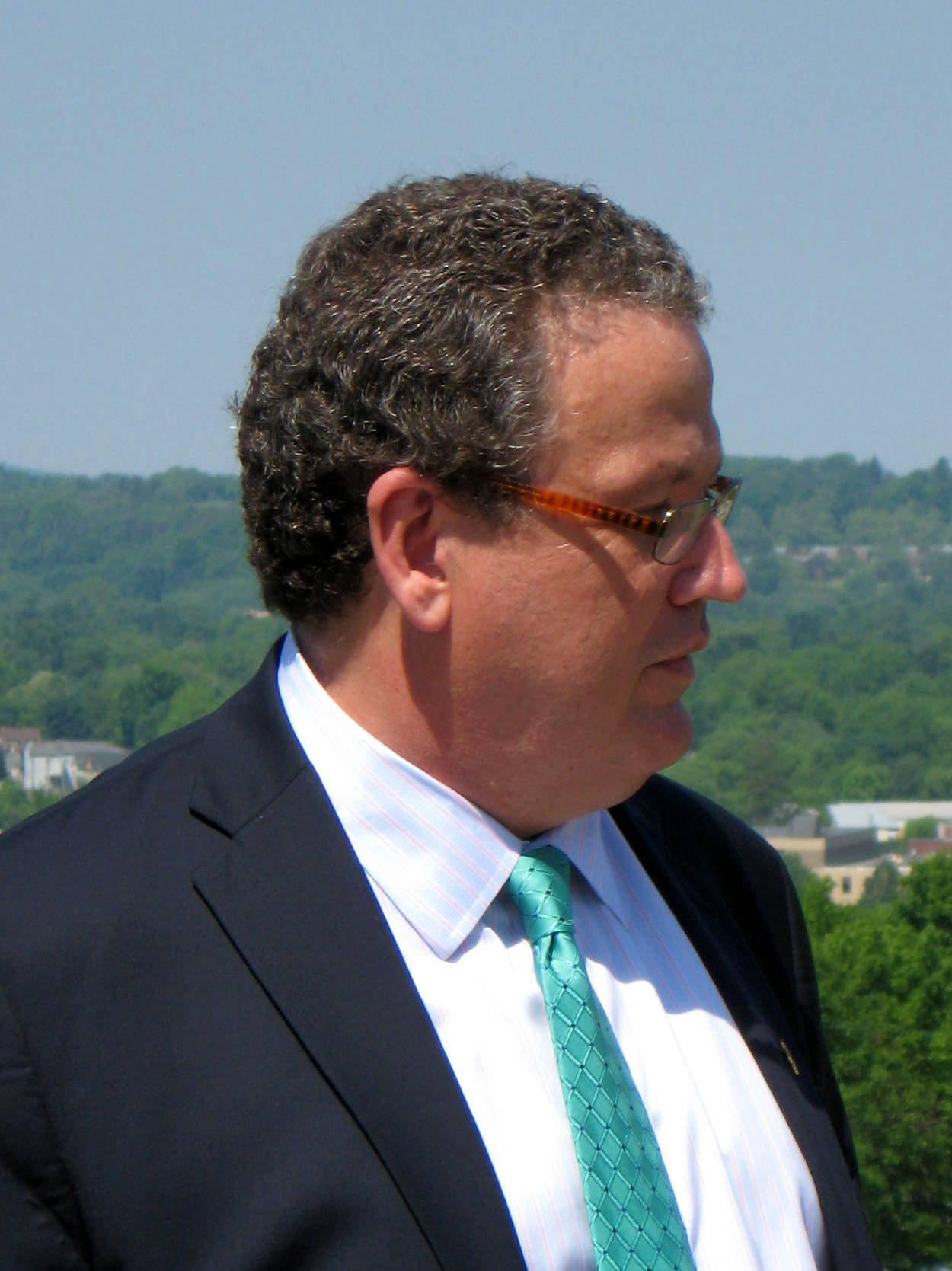

President SUNY Environmental Science and Forestry
- In office January 2014 – June 30, 2018
- Preceded by: Cornelius B. Murphy, Jr.
- Succeeded by: David C. Amberg

Vice-President and Dean ASU College of Liberal Arts and Sciences
- In office 2007 – 2011

Interim Dean ASU Division Of Natural Sciences
- In office 2006–2007

Personal details
- Education: Ohio State University (B.S.), (M.S.), (Ph.D.)
- Fields: Entomology; Taxonomy; Phylogenetics

Quentin Duane Wheeler (born January 31, 1954) is an American entomologist, taxonomist, author and newspaper columnist, and is the founding director of the International Institute for Species Exploration. He was the fourth President of the State University of New York College of Environmental Science and Forestry, in Syracuse, New York until his retirement. Other positions have included: professor of entomology at Cornell University and Arizona State University; Keeper and Head of Entomology at the Natural History Museum in London; and Director of the Division of Environmental Biology at the National Science Foundation.

== Education ==
Wheeler holds bachelor (1976), master's (1977) and Ph.D. (1980) degrees in entomology from Ohio State University. His Ph.D. dissertation is titled, "Comparative morphology, cladistics, and a revised classification of the genera Lymexylidae (Coleoptera), including descriptions of two new genera".

== Career ==
Wheeler was a faculty member for 24 years at Cornell University, where he earned the rank of tenured full professor. He was chair of entomology and director of the Liberty Hyde Bailey Hortorium at Cornell. Wheeler also previously served as the Keeper and Head of Entomology at the Natural History Museum in London from 2004–2006, and was director of the Division of Environmental Biology at the National Science Foundation from 2001-2004.

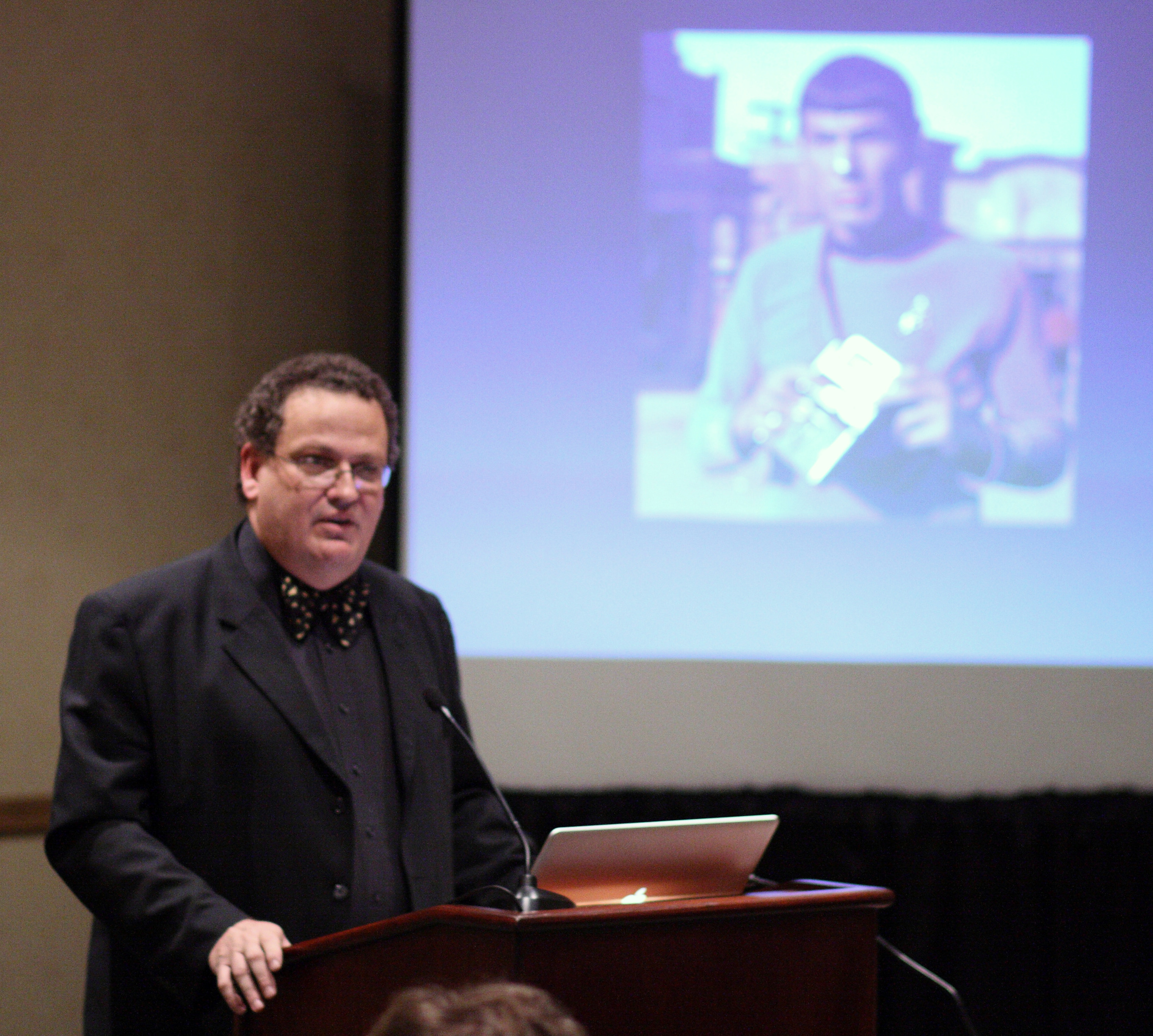
Quentin Wheeler, speaking at the annual meeting of the History of Science Society, Phoenix, Arizona, November 2009 (photo by Sage Ross)

Wheeler joined Arizona State University in 2006. He was the Virginia M. Ullman Professor of Natural History and the Environment, and founding executive director of the International Institute for Species Exploration. Wheeler served as interim dean of the Division of Natural Sciences in 2006, and in 2007 was appointed to the position of vice president and dean of the College of Liberal Arts and Sciences, a position he held until 2011. He was President of the State University of New York College of Environmental Science and Forestry from January 2014 through June 2018.

== Research ==
Wheeler's research career has focused on the role of species exploration and natural history collections in the exploration and conservation of biodiversity; theory and practice of phylogenetic systematics and cybertaxonomy; the evolution and classification of insects, especially beetles; and public science education. He has received a number of academic honors, including fellowships from the American Association for the Advancement of Science, Linnean Society of London and Royal Entomological Society. He has had three species of beetles named in his honor, such as Tonerus wheeleri, Eleodes wheeleri, and Agathisium wheeleri.

He is the author of approximately 150 scientific articles and six books, including What on Earth? – 100 of Our Planet's Most Amazing New Species. He has named more than 100 new species and writes a periodic column on new species for The Guardian newspaper in London.

== Key works ==
Articles

Among Wheeler's most highly cited articles are:

- Watrous, Larry E.; Wheeler, Quentin D. (1981). "The out-group comparison method of character analysis". Systematic Biology. 30 (1): 1–11. doi:10.1093/sysbio/30.1.1.
- Nixon, Kevin C.; Wheeler, Quentin D. (1990). "An amplification of the phylogenetic species concept". Cladistics. 6 (3): 211–223. doi:10.1111/j.1096-0031.1990.tb00541.x. S2CID 84095773.
- Wheeler, Quentin D (2004). "Taxonomic triage and the poverty of phylogeny". Philosophical Transactions of the Royal Society of London B. 359 (1444): 571–583. doi:10.1098/rstb.2003.1452. PMC 1693342. PMID 15253345.
- Wheeler, Quentin D.; Raven, Peter H.; Wilson, Edward O. (2004). "January 16). "Taxonomy: impediment or expedient" (editorial)". Science. 303 (5656): 285. doi:10.1126/science.303.5656.285. hdl:1808/295. PMID 14726557.

Books

Wheeler's most widely held books include:

- Wheeler, Quentin D., and Meredith Blackwell, eds. 1984. Fungus-insect relationships: perspectives in ecology and evolution. New York: Columbia University Press. ISBN 978-0231056946
- Novacek, Michael J., and Quentin Wheeler, eds. 1992. Extinction and phylogeny. New York: Columbia University Press. ISBN 978-0231074384
- Wheeler, Quentin D., and Rudolf Meier, eds. 2000. Species concepts and phylogenetic theory: a debate. New York: Columbia University Press. ISBN 978-0231101431
- Wheeler, Quentin D., eds. 2008. The New Taxonomy. Boca Raton: CRC Press. ISBN 978-0849390883
- Knapp, Sandra, and Quentin D. Wheeler, eds. 2009. Letters to Linnaeus. London: Linnean Society of London. ISBN 978-0950620794
- Wheeler, Quentin D., and Sara Pennak. 2013. What on Earth? 100 of our planet's most amazing new species. New York: Plume. ISBN 978-0452298149
- Williams, David, Schmitt, Michael, and Quentin Wheeler, eds. 2016. "The future of phylogenetic systematics: The legacy of Willi Hennig". Cambridge: Cambridge University Press. ISBN 978-1107117648

== See also ==
- List of heads of the New York State College of Forestry
- Phylogenetics
- Taxonomy

Academic offices
Preceded by Cornelius B. Murphy, Jr.	President of SUNY Environmental Science & Forestry; January 2014–June 2018	Succeeded by David C. Amberg (Interim)
