= Joseph S. Illick =

American academic

Joseph S. Illick (16 September 1884 – 31 August 1967) was Dean of the New York State College of Forestry at Syracuse University, from 1944 to 1951. He was a graduate of Lafayette College (1907), and the Biltmore Forest School (1913); he studied at the Ludwig-Maximilians-Universität München, as well. Prior to coming to New York, Illick was State Forester, in Pennsylvania.
