= Pinodytes newtoni =

Scientific classification
- Domain: Eukaryota
- Kingdom: Animalia
- Phylum: Arthropoda
- Class: Insecta
- Order: Coleoptera
- Suborder: Polyphaga
- Infraorder: Staphyliniformia
- Family: Leiodidae
- Genus: Pinodytes
- Species: P. newtoni

Binomial name
- Pinodytes newtoni Peck & Cook, 2011

Species of beetle

Pinodytes newtoni is a species of eyeless soil fungivore beetle in the family Leiodidae. It is found in North America.
