= Catopocerini =

Scientific classification
- Domain: Eukaryota
- Kingdom: Animalia
- Phylum: Arthropoda
- Class: Insecta
- Order: Coleoptera
- Suborder: Polyphaga
- Infraorder: Staphyliniformia
- Family: Leiodidae
- Subfamily: Catopocerinae
- Tribe: Catopocerini; Hatch, 1927

Tribe of beetles

Catopocerini is a tribe of eyeless soil fungivore beetles in the family Leiodidae. There are at least 2 genera and more than 40 described species in Catopocerini.

== Genera ==
These two genera belong to the tribe Catopocerini:

- Catopocerus Motschulsky, 1870
- Pinodytes Horn, 1880
