= Pinodytes =

Scientific classification
- Kingdom: Animalia
- Phylum: Arthropoda
- Class: Insecta
- Order: Coleoptera
- Suborder: Polyphaga
- Infraorder: Staphyliniformia
- Family: Leiodidae
- Tribe: Catopocerini
- Genus: Pinodytes; Horn, 1880

Genus of beetles

Pinodytes is a genus of eyeless soil fungivore beetles in the family Leiodidae. There are at least 40 described species in Pinodytes.

== Species ==
- Pinodytes angulatus Peck and Cook, 2011
- Pinodytes borealis Peck and Cook, 2011
- Pinodytes capizzii (Hatch, 1957)
- Pinodytes chandleri Peck and Cook, 2011
- Pinodytes colorado Peck and Cook, 2011
- Pinodytes constrictus Peck and Cook, 2011
- Pinodytes contortus Peck and Cook, 2011
- Pinodytes cryptophagoides (Mannerheim, 1852)
- Pinodytes delnorte Peck and Cook, 2011
- Pinodytes eldorado Peck and Cook, 2011
- Pinodytes fresno Peck and Cook, 2011
- Pinodytes garibaldi Peck and Cook, 2011
- Pinodytes gibbosus Peck & Cook, 2011
- Pinodytes haidagwaii Peck and Cook, 2011
- Pinodytes humboldtensis Peck and Cook, 2011
- Pinodytes idaho Peck and Cook, 2011
- Pinodytes imbricatus (Hatch, 1957)
- Pinodytes isabella Peck and Cook, 2011
- Pinodytes klamathensis Peck and Cook, 2011
- Pinodytes losangeles Peck and Cook, 2011
- Pinodytes marinensis Peck and Cook, 2011
- Pinodytes minutus Peck and Cook, 2011
- Pinodytes monterey Peck and Cook, 2011
- Pinodytes newelli (Hatch, 1957)
- Pinodytes newtoni Peck & Cook, 2011
- Pinodytes orca Peck and Cook, 2011
- Pinodytes ovatus (Hatch, 1957)
- Pinodytes parvus Peck and Cook, 2011
- Pinodytes punctatus Peck and Cook, 2011
- Pinodytes pusio Horn, 1892
- Pinodytes rothi (Hatch, 1957)
- Pinodytes sanjacinto Peck and Cook, 2011
- Pinodytes sequoia Peck and Cook, 2011
- Pinodytes setosus Peck and Cook, 2011
- Pinodytes shasta Peck and Cook, 2011
- Pinodytes shoshone Peck and Cook, 2011
- Pinodytes sinuatus Peck and Cook, 2011
- Pinodytes spinus Peck and Cook, 2011
- Pinodytes subterraneus (Hatch, 1935)
- Pinodytes tehama Peck and Cook, 2011
- Pinodytes tibialis (Hatch, 1957)
- Pinodytes tuolumne Peck and Cook, 2011
