= Colenis impunctata =

Scientific classification
- Domain: Eukaryota
- Kingdom: Animalia
- Phylum: Arthropoda
- Class: Insecta
- Order: Coleoptera
- Suborder: Polyphaga
- Infraorder: Staphyliniformia
- Family: Leiodidae
- Genus: Colenis
- Species: C. impunctata

Binomial name
- Colenis impunctata LeConte, 1853

Species of beetle

Colenis impunctata is a species of round fungus beetle in the family Leiodidae. It is found in North America.
