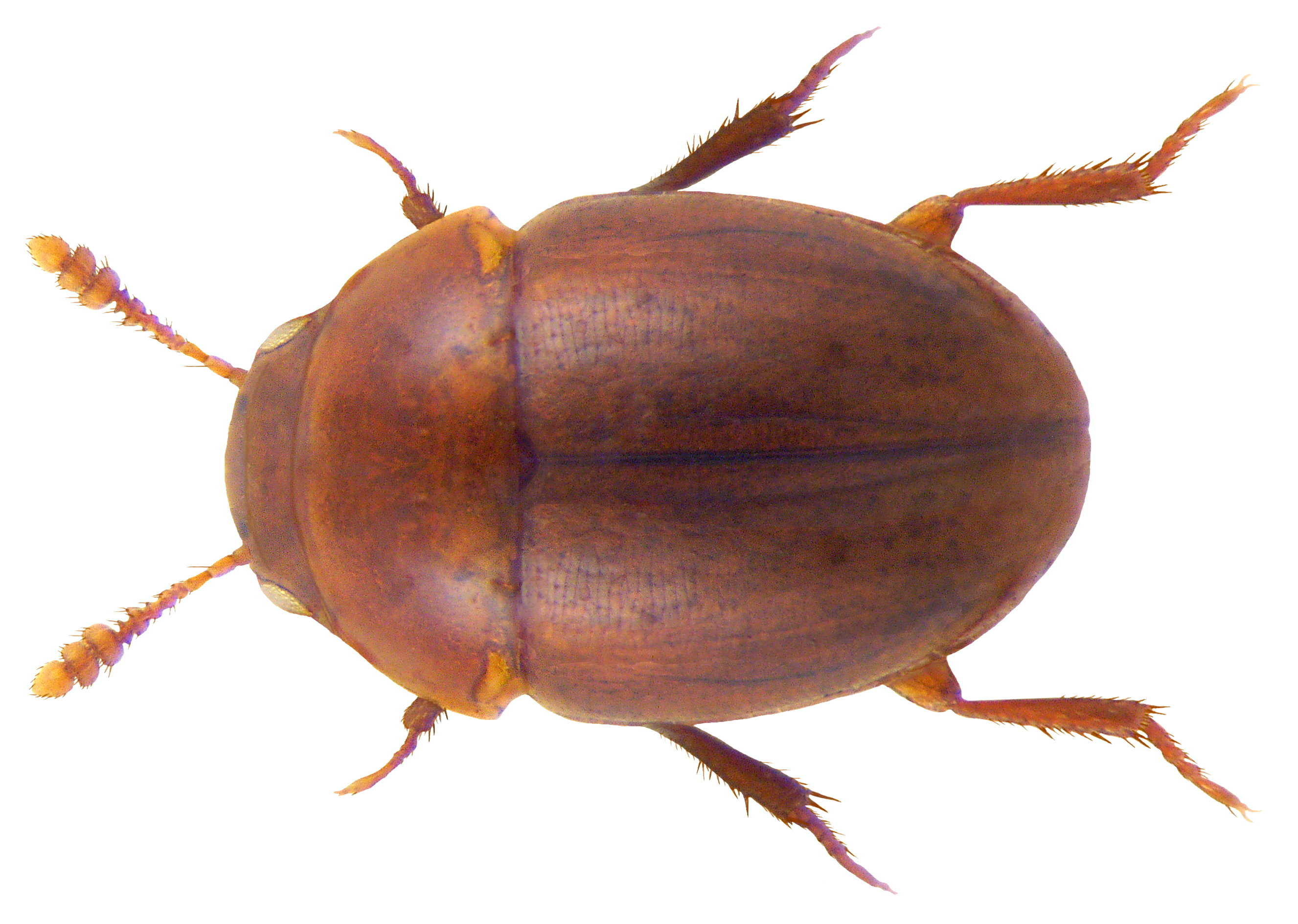
- Colenis immunda

Scientific classification
- Kingdom: Animalia
- Phylum: Arthropoda
- Class: Insecta
- Order: Coleoptera
- Suborder: Polyphaga
- Infraorder: Staphyliniformia
- Family: Leiodidae
- Subfamily: Leiodinae
- Genus: Colenis; Erichson, 1842

= Colenis =

Genus of beetles

Colenis is a genus of round fungus beetles in the family Leiodidae. There are about eight described species in Colenis.

== Species ==
These eight species belong to the genus Colenis:

- Colenis bifida Peck, 1998
- Colenis bonnairei Jacquelin du Val, 1859
- Colenis immunda (Sturm, 1807)
- Colenis impunctata LeConte, 1853
- Colenis laevis LeConte, 1853
- Colenis ora Peck, 1998-01
- Colenis stephani Peck, 1998-01
- Colenis terrena Hisamatsu, 1985
