= Kalohydnobius dentatus =

Scientific classification
- Kingdom: Animalia
- Phylum: Arthropoda
- Class: Insecta
- Order: Coleoptera
- Suborder: Polyphaga
- Infraorder: Staphyliniformia
- Family: Leiodidae
- Genus: Kalohydnobius
- Species: K. dentatus

Binomial name
- Kalohydnobius dentatus Peck & Cook, 2009

Species of beetle

Kalohydnobius dentatus is a species of round fungus beetle in the family Leiodidae. It is found in North America.
