= Kalohydnobius =

Scientific classification
- Kingdom: Animalia
- Phylum: Arthropoda
- Class: Insecta
- Order: Coleoptera
- Suborder: Polyphaga
- Infraorder: Staphyliniformia
- Family: Leiodidae
- Subfamily: Leiodinae
- Tribe: Sogdini
- Genus: Kalohydnobius; Peck & Cook, 2009

Genus of beetles

Kalohydnobius is a genus of round fungus beetles in the family Leiodidae. There are at least 4 described species in Kalohydnobius.

== Species ==
- Kalohydnobius californicus Peck and Cook, 2009
- Kalohydnobius dentatus Peck & Cook, 2009
- Kalohydnobius strigilatus (Horn, 1880)
