= Kalohydnobius strigilatus =

Scientific classification
- Kingdom: Animalia
- Phylum: Arthropoda
- Class: Insecta
- Order: Coleoptera
- Suborder: Polyphaga
- Infraorder: Staphyliniformia
- Family: Leiodidae
- Genus: Kalohydnobius
- Species: K. strigilatus

Binomial name
- Kalohydnobius strigilatus (Horn, 1880)

Synonyms
- Hydnobius femoratus Horn, 1880; Hydnobius strigilatus Hatch, 1936

Species of beetle

Kalohydnobius strigilatus is a species of round fungus beetle in the family Leiodidae. It is found in North America.
