= Triarthron =

Scientific classification
- Domain: Eukaryota
- Kingdom: Animalia
- Phylum: Arthropoda
- Class: Insecta
- Order: Coleoptera
- Suborder: Polyphaga
- Infraorder: Staphyliniformia
- Family: Leiodidae
- Tribe: Sogdini
- Genus: Triarthron; Märkel, 1840

Genus of beetles

Triarthron is a genus of round fungus beetles in the family Leiodidae. There are at least two described species in Triarthron.

== Species ==
These two species belong to the genus Triarthron:

- Triarthron lecontei Horn, 1868
- Triarthron maerkelii Märkel, 1840
