= Triarthron lecontei =

Scientific classification
- Domain: Eukaryota
- Kingdom: Animalia
- Phylum: Arthropoda
- Class: Insecta
- Order: Coleoptera
- Suborder: Polyphaga
- Infraorder: Staphyliniformia
- Family: Leiodidae
- Genus: Triarthron
- Species: T. lecontei

Binomial name
- Triarthron lecontei Horn, 1868

Synonyms
- Triarthron cedonulli Schaufuss, 1882; Triarthron pennsylvanicum Horn, 1883

Species of beetle

Lateral view

Triarthron lecontei is a species of round fungus beetle in the family Leiodidae. It is found in North America.
