= History of the New York State College of Forestry =

The New York State College of Forestry, the first professional school of forestry in North America, opened its doors at Cornell University, in Ithaca, New York, in the autumn of 1898. It was advocated for by Governor Frank S. Black, but after just a few years of operation, it was defunded in 1903, by Governor Benjamin B. Odell in response to public outcry over the college's controversial forestry practices in the Adirondacks.

Less than a decade later, in 1911, the New York State College of Forestry was reestablished at Syracuse University by the New York State Legislature, with a mandate for forest conservation. The institution has continued to evolve and is now part of the State University of New York (SUNY) system, while still closely related and immediately adjacent to Syracuse University. Today, the State University of New York College of Environmental Science and Forestry, or SUNY-ESF, is a doctoral degree-granting institution based in Syracuse, New York, with facilities and forest properties in several additional locations in upstate New York and Costa Rica; it commemorated its centennial anniversary in 2011.

== Founding at Cornell University ==
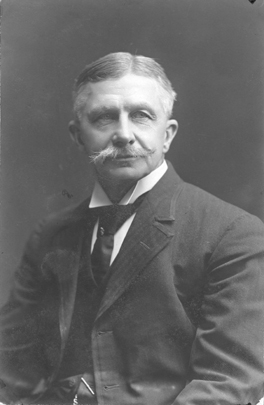
Bernhard Fernow, first Dean of the College

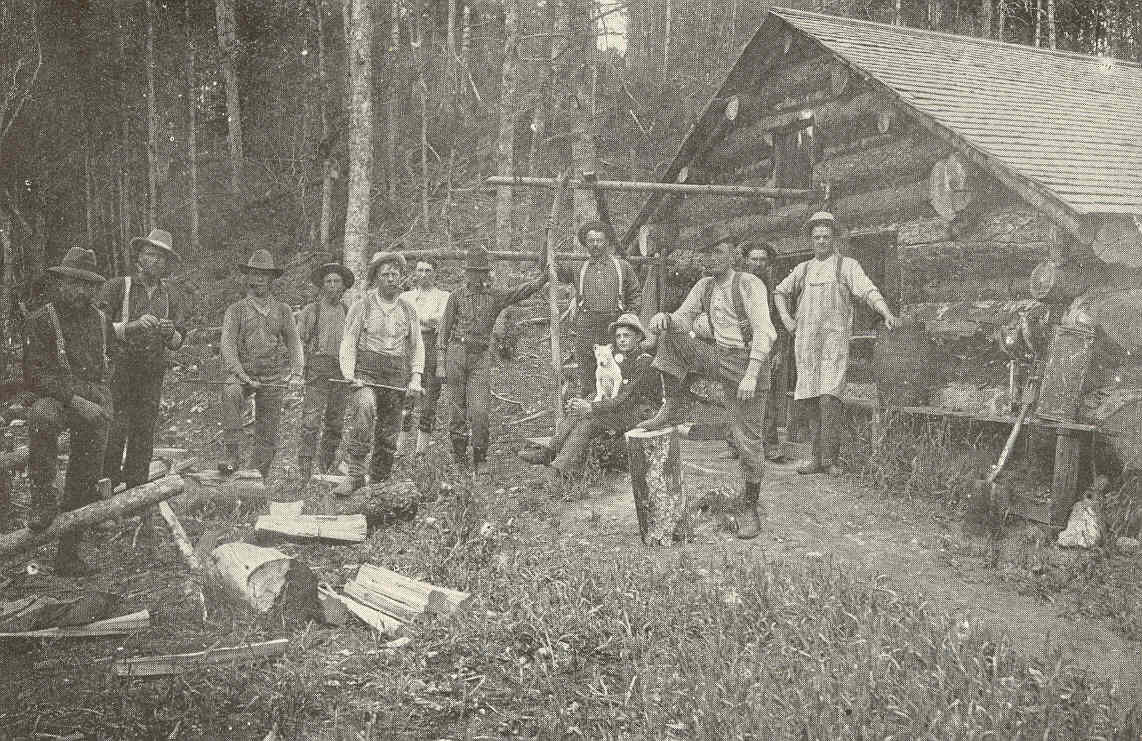
Students and Loggers in Permanent Camp on the Cornell Forest Reserve

The New York State College of Forestry, the first professional school of forestry in North America, was founded at Cornell University in Ithaca, NY, "by an act of the New York State Legislature in April 1898." Along with the establishment of the college, the legislature also provided for the purchase of 30,000 acres (120 km^{2}) of forest in the Adirondack Mountains, the Axton tract near Upper Saranac Lake, from the Santa Clara Lumber Company, for $165,000. This act came as an enlightened response to the devastation being wrought at the time by indiscriminate logging not only in New York, but also in Pennsylvania, Michigan ("the lands that nobody wanted"), Wisconsin, and elsewhere.

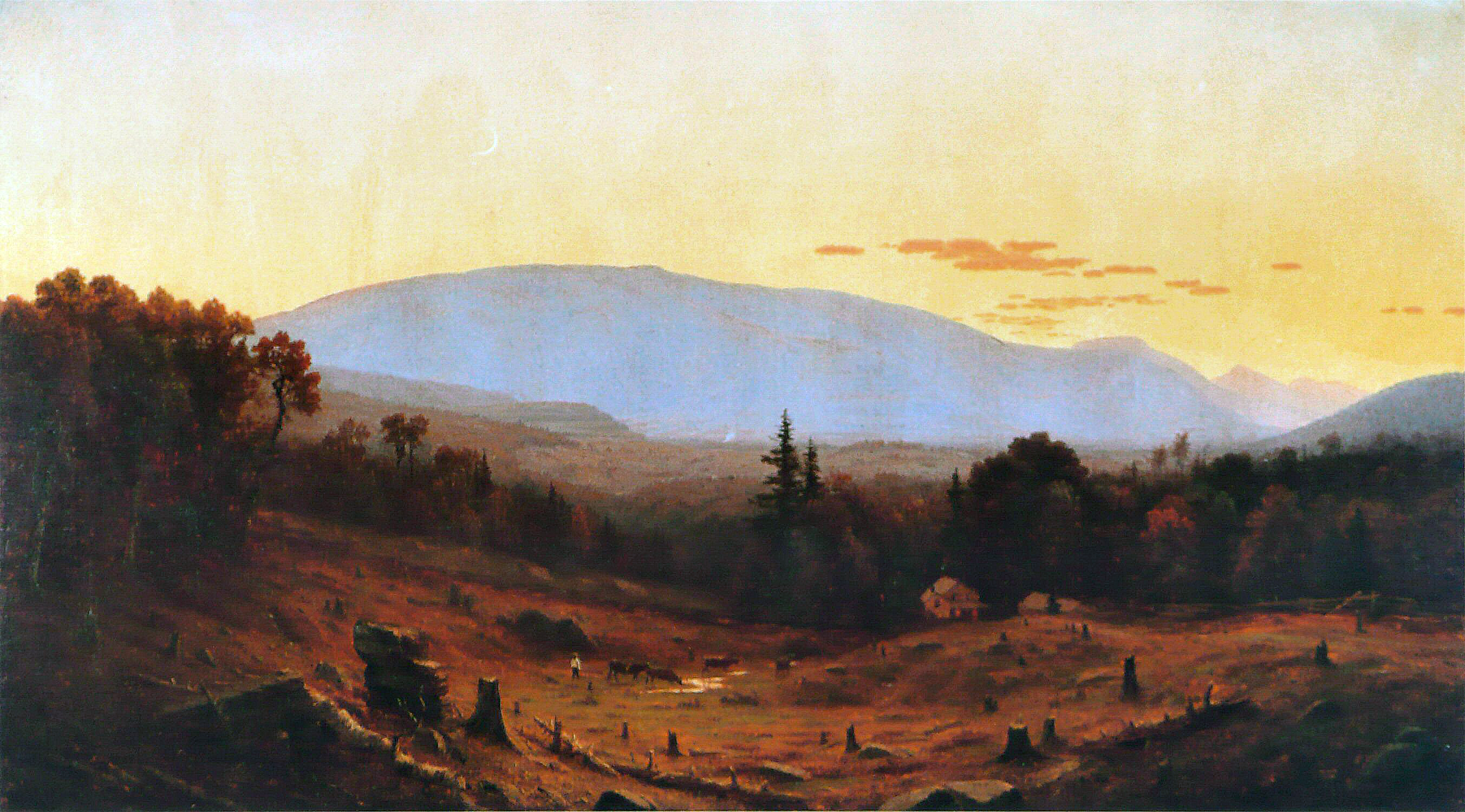
Hunter Mountain, Twilight (1866) by Hudson River School artist Sanford Robinson Gifford, showing the devastation wrought by years of tanbarking and logging.

This was not Cornell University's first venture into forestry. Almost forty years earlier, under the 1862 Morrill Land Grant Act, the Federal land grant scrip for New York state of 989,920 acres was given to Cornell, to the later chagrin of the trustees of Syracuse and New York Universities. As a matter of fact, Genesee College, the forerunner of Syracuse University, accepted $25,000 from Ezra Cornell to drop its opposition to the proceeds from the Morrill Land grant going to Cornell University. Ezra Cornell, under advice from lumberman trustee Henry W. Sage, wisely parlayed the grant into ownership of Wisconsin pine lands that he held until the wanton logging was diminished and the price for lumber increased, providing a substantial endowment for the university.

Dr. Bernhard Fernow, then chief of the USDA's Division of Forestry, was invited to head the new college. In preparation for assuming this new post, Fernow visited George Vanderbilt's Biltmore Estate, where Dr. Carl A. Schenck was establishing the Biltmore Forest School. Fernow saw the mission of forestry education as different, if complementary, to that envisioned by Schenk. In subsequent correspondence with Schenck, Fernow wrote that "the Cornell School of Forestry 'shall greatly lack in practical demonstration' and variety of demonstrations", and inquired whether "Cornell students [could] supplement their education by summer courses at Biltmore."

Fernow resigned his Federal appointment in July 1898 to come to Ithaca. "At ten o'clock on the morning of September 22 or 23, 1898, in a classroom in Morrill Hall", classes commenced at the New York College of Forestry, "the first professional school of forestry in North America", according to Professor Ralph Hosmer. Just two years later, in the fall of 1900, the New York State College of Forestry had 24 students; Biltmore nine students in its 12-month program; and Yale's new postgraduate forestry program, seven.

A fruitful marriage or hybridization between German methods (Professor Bernhard Fernow) and American practice of forestry, silviculture came about in the person of Raphael Zon, an emigre' from Simbirsk, Russia. Part of North America's very first graduating class in forestry from the New York State College of Forestry at Cornell in 1901, Zon later became a "giant" among American foresters, or as Secretary of Agriculture Claude R. Wickard said, the "dean of all foresters of America."

== Publication of the Forestry Quarterly ==
Forestry Quarterly, later to be merged into the Journal of Forestry, was first published in October 1902, at the New York State College of Forestry at Cornell University, under the editorial advisement of Bernhard Fernow, John Gifford, and Walter Mulford. The affiliation lasted only through the first volume, as publication was disrupted by the closure of the College in 1903. Subsequently, the Quarterly was published independently with a board of editors composed of many prominent figures in American forestry in the early part of the 20th century, including Editor-in-Chief Bernhard Fernow and Carl Schenck, founder of the Biltmore Forest School.

== Defunding of the College ==
The fledgling college of forestry soon became mired in controversy, centered around Fernow's management of the forest lands given to Cornell by the state "for experiments in forestry". Soon after his appointment as Dean, Fernow moved quickly to establish a demonstration forest on the 30,000 acres (120 km^{2}) of land in the Adirondack forests acquired by Cornell with the authorization for the new college. The site was near Axton, New York, location of an old lumber settlement originally called Axe-town, in Franklin County.

Fernow's plan called for clearcutting the tract at the rate of several thousand acres per year to prepare for planting conifers. With an annual state appropriation for the college of only $10,000, Cornell entered into a contract with the Brooklyn Cooperage Company for the project to be viable. Under terms of the contract, the firm was to take the logs and cordwood from the forest land for a 15-year period. (In the 1890s, the more valuable red spruce trees had been logged, leaving primarily northern hardwoods.) Fernow had a 6-mile (9.7 km)-long railroad spur built from Axton to Tupper Lake in order to deliver logs to the company's facility. The firm turned the hardwood logs into barrels and the cordwood into methanol and charcoal, through a process called destructive distillation.

The contract proved to be profitable and beneficial for the company only. To his credit, Fernow established the first tree nursery in New York State at Axton. But Cornell gained insufficient funds from the relationship to fully replant the clear-cut areas. Most of the non-native conifer species that were planted, such as Norway spruce, did not do well for years, with a denuded area resulting.

The demonstration forest, near Saranac Lake, drew heated opposition from neighboring land owners. Smoke from the burning of brush and logging slash, along with Fernow's disposition toward landowners from nearby Saranac Lake further alienated the public. Fernow's actions drew criticism also from Adirondack guides such as Ellsworth Petty (father of Clarence Petty), who protested the plan and, in a letter writing campaign, successfully lobbied the State to assign a special "Committee of the Adirondacks" to tour the Axton site. In its findings, the commission concluded that "the college has exceeded the original intention of the State when the tract was granted the university for conducting silvicultural experiments."

A lawsuit was filed against the Brooklyn Cooperage Company, with the People of New York State as plaintiff. It was officially entitled, People v. the Brooklyn Cooperage Company. Cornell was included in the lawsuit so that its contract with the firm could be annulled.

In May 1903, Governor Benjamin B. Odell made a pocket veto of funding to continue the new college. In his statement, Governor Odell said: "The operations of the College of Forestry have been subjected to grave criticism, as they have practically denuded the forest lands of the State without compensating benefits. I deem it wise therefore to withhold approval of this item until a more scientific and more reasonable method is pursued in the forestry of the lands now under the control of Cornell University."

On the night when the telegram arrived announcing Governor Odell's veto of the annual appropriation for the College of Forestry, Dean Fernow was at a dance. Despite the bad news, the dance went on. Fernow and the forestry students offered to carry on the school. However, Cornell's Board of Trustees and President Schurman, despite Bailey's urgings to the contrary, decided to close the doors of the Forestry College. In June, 1903, instruction in the college ceased and the faculty was dismissed.

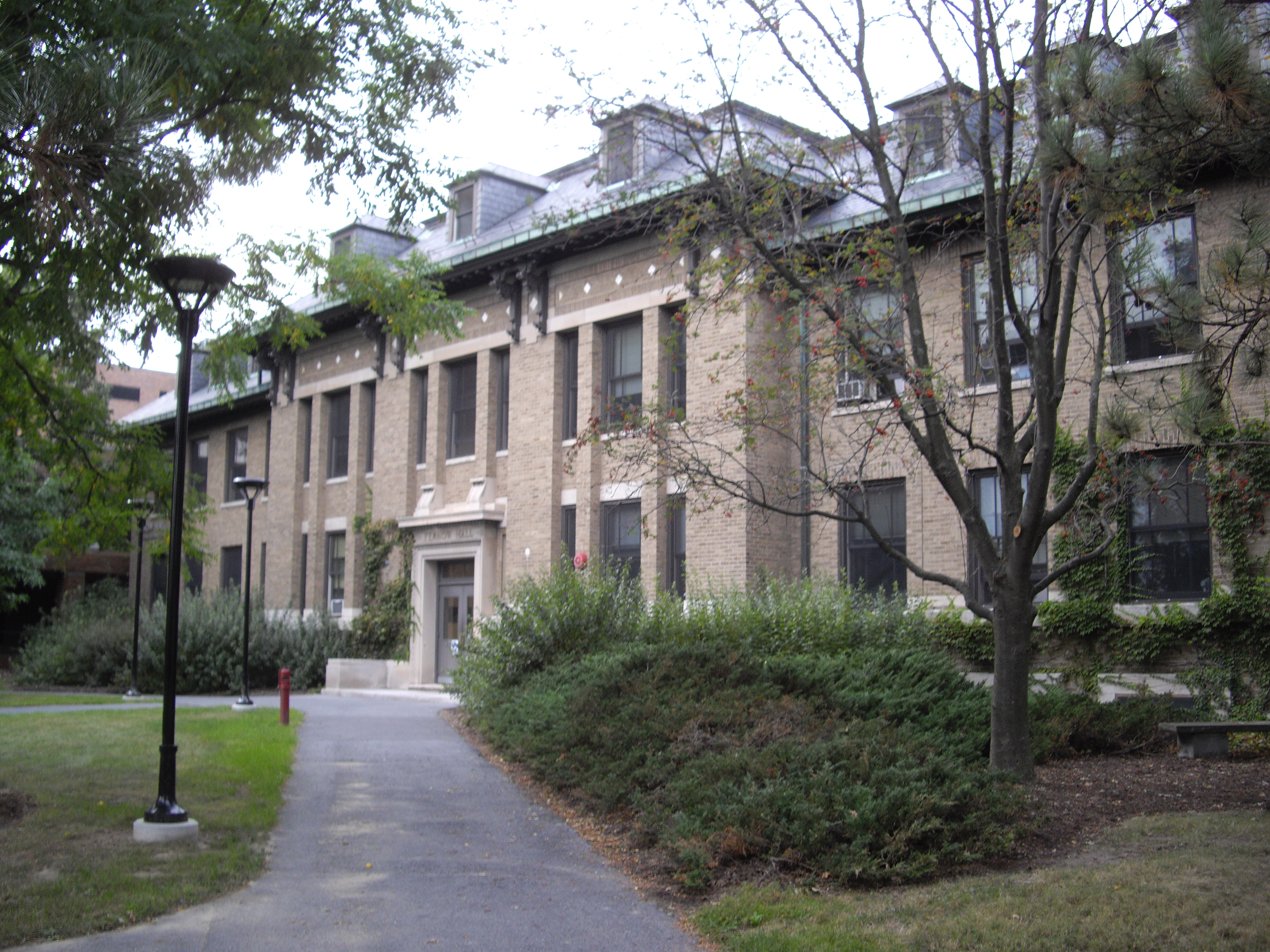
Fernow Hall, Cornell University

== Forestry Studies continue at Cornell ==
Forestry continued at Cornell, with Dean Liberty Hyde Bailey adding a Department of Forestry to the New York State College of Agriculture at Cornell University in 1910–11. Walter Mulford, of the University of Michigan, was appointed as department chair. At Dean Bailey's request, in 1911, the New York Legislature appropriated $100,000 (~$2.51 million in 2025) to construct a building to house the Forestry Department on the Cornell campus; the building was later named Fernow Hall.

In 1914, noted forester Ralph Hosmer, a 1902 graduate of the Yale School of Forestry and contemporary of Gifford Pinchot, replaced Mulford as Professor and head of the Department of Forestry at the New York State College of Agriculture at Cornell University, a position he held until his retirement in June 1942.

== Reestablishment at Syracuse University ==
The New York State College of Forestry was reestablished on July 28, 1911 at Syracuse University, through a special bill signed by New York's Governor John Alden Dix. Louis Marshall, with a summer residence at Knollwood Club on Saranac Lake and a prime mover for the establishment of the Adirondack and Catskill Forest Preserve (New York), understood that a "proper" College of Forestry was needed in New York state. In 1910, Marshall became a Syracuse University Trustee and confided in Syracuse University Chancellor James R. Day his desire to have a forestry school at the university. Marshall was designated by his fellow trustees to lobby Governor Charles E. Hughes towards such an end:

...one of the greatest duties of State and National Governments is that of conserving our natural resources. First among these are our forests... there is no greater subject as to which there is more widespread ignorance, than that of forest conservation and the planting of forests.... The State of New York... is the owner of millions of acres of forest lands which are in constant jeopardy, and which is beginning to suffer the consequences of the evils of deforestation... [The State] is under an imperative duty to ... call a halt to the wild rage for destruction which seems to grow by what it feeds upon.... If the bill should become a law, it is the intention of the Board of Trustees of Syracuse University to select ... a number of gentlemen who are enthusiastic in their desire to further the great cause of forest conservation...

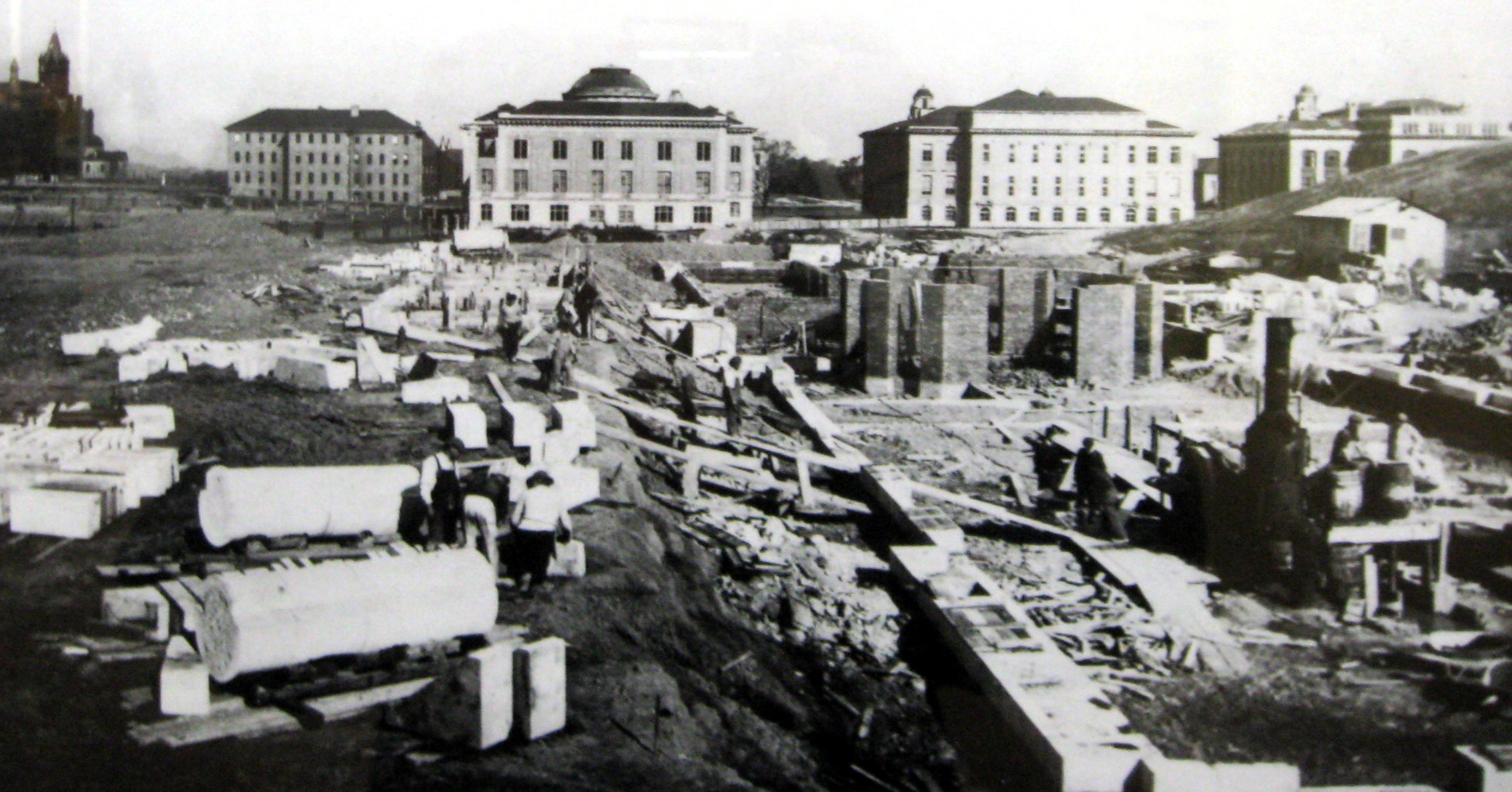
Bray Hall under construction, New York State College of Forestry at Syracuse University, c. 1914

By 1911, Marshall's efforts resulted in passage of New York State Senate Bill No. 18, "An Act to establish a State College of Forestry at Syracuse University, and making appropriation therefor", to establish and fund the school. The bill was signed by Governor Dix, and the College "incorporated by Chapter 851 of the Laws of 1911". Marshall was elected president of the newly reestablished college's board of trustees, a position he held until his death in 1929. The relationship were not always smooth, for example in 1913, there were frictious exchanges between Syracuse University Chancellor James R. Day and Board of Inquiry appointed by the newly elected Governor William Sulzer over the proper location of the college (other location being Cornell).

The first dean of the College at Syracuse University, from 1911–12, was William L. Bray, Ph.D. University of Chicago, botanist, plant ecologist, biogeographer and Professor of Botany at Syracuse University. In 1911, in addition to assuming the deanship of forestry he organized the Agricultural Division at Syracuse University. The first class enrolled 52 students and had only two faculty members, but tuition was free.

Bray's successor, from 1912–20, was Dr. Hugh P. Baker, a graduate of Yale's School of Forestry (M.F., 1904) and LMU Munich (Ph.D., Economics, 1910). Baker previously had worked with the United States Bureau of Forestry and Forest Service (1901–04), and before coming to Syracuse had been Professor of Forestry at the Pennsylvania State College.

In 1913, funds for construction of Bray Hall, the first campus building, were still languishing in the state capital. Louis Marshall, as president of the college's board of trustees, wanted action, so two years after the appropriation bill was first signed by Governor Dix, Marshall went to the newly elected governor William Sulzer, who reportedly had wanted to further delay signing the $250,000 appropriation. It is reputed that Marshall handed him a pen and said, "Sign it." Governor Sulzer complied.

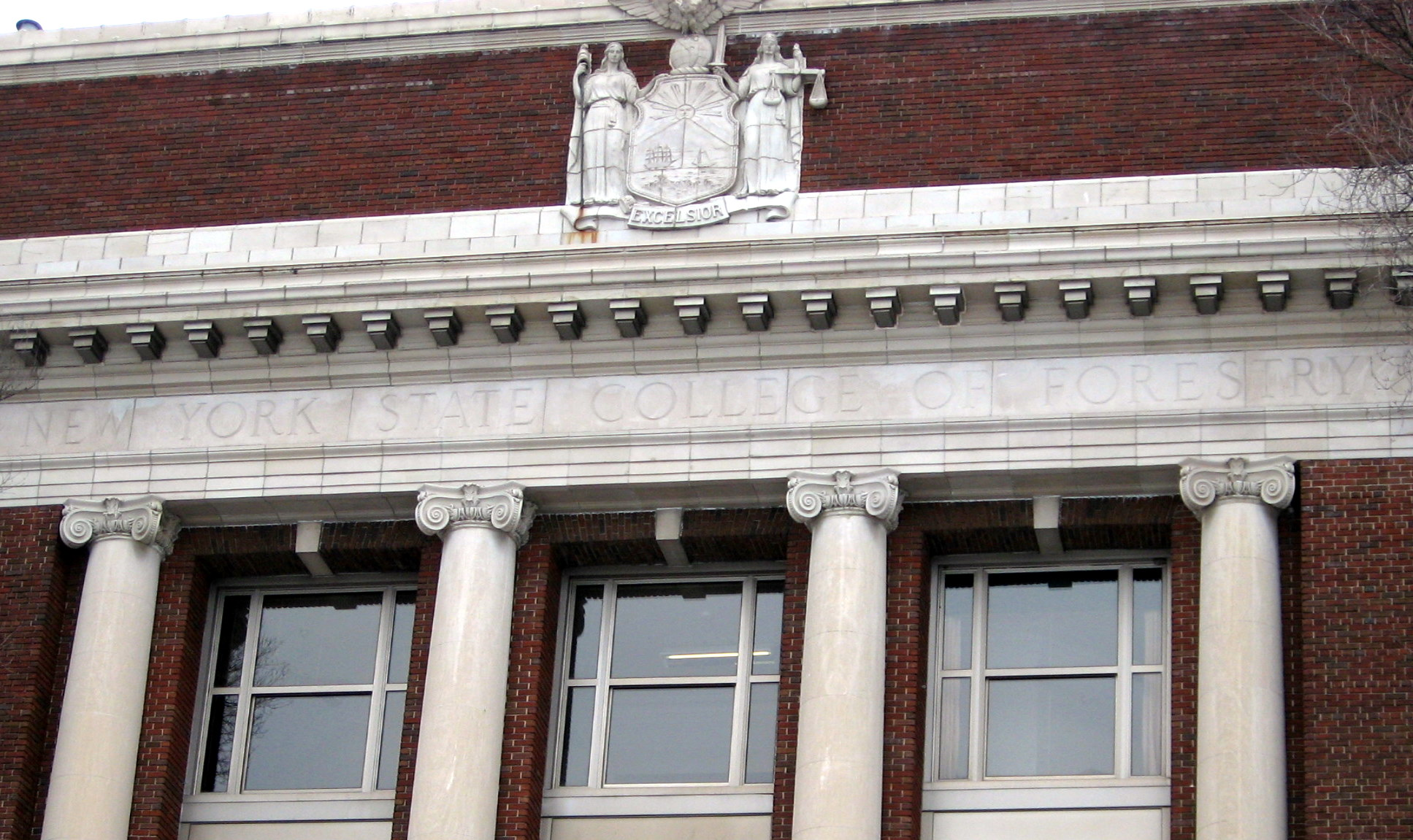
Bray Hall today, SUNY-ESF

By 1913, according to Marshall, the college had "160 students, representing 46 counties of [New York] State. It has developed a faculty of eight trained men, all of whom are graduates of forest schools of high standing.... Dr. Hugh P. Baker, who is the Dean of the College ... has received applications from over eight hundred prospective students." Dean Baker said that these prospective student inquiries come from twenty-five States and six foreign countries. Graduate courses at the college were authorized in 1918. Female students were enrolled as early as 1915, but the first female graduated from ESF only in 1940.

This is what ESF president Dr. Cornelius B. Murphy, Jr. had to say at the re-dedication of Marshall Hall on January 19, 2001: "Louis Marshall is largely the reason that everyone from the college is here today. Louis Marshall was recruited by Chancellor Day in 1910 to make the concept of the 'forestry college' at Syracuse University a reality. Louis was tenacious, prodding both the Governor and the Legislature to take action. Louis Marshall... lobbied for the $250,000 appropriation to make a building a reality. I think that it is safe to say that Louis Marshall was our father, our first leader and our first forester. Today we rededicate this building to his memory and accomplishments." The re-dedication events included the unveiling of two bronze plaques: one in honor of Louis Marshall and the other in honor of his son, ESF alumnus, Bob Marshall.

As Dean of the New York State College of Forestry at Syracuse University, Nelson Courtlandt Brown, secured the gift of the Charles Lathrop Pack Demonstration Forest, soon to be followed by a 15,000 acre Archer Milton Huntington and Anna Hyatt Huntington Wildlife Forest in Newcomb, New York. Brown subsequently secured the state appropriation for Marshall Hall, which offered greater teaching and laboratory space. Brown also procured increases in state appropriations for teaching salaries, as well as a grant of $10,000 for forest investigations.

Samuel N. Spring was appointed dean of the New York State College of Forestry in Syracuse, NY in February 1933, succeeding Baker. Spring served as Dean of the College of Forestry until his retirement in May 1944.

Among the salient differences between the forestry programs at Cornell and Syracuse were the wood utilization, wood chemistry and pulp & paper majors at the latter.

== Incorporation into SUNY ==
With the formation of the State University of New York (SUNY) in 1948, the State College of Forestry became a specialized college within the multi-campus SUNY system. The college's name was changed to State University College of Forestry at Syracuse University. In 1972, with burgeoning public interest in environmental education, the college's name was changed again, to the State University of New York College of Environmental Science and Forestry (SUNY-ESF). Today, the college retains a close relationship with Syracuse University, but is autonomous, unlike some other state-supported colleges at private institutions in New York state. ESF students not only take courses, enroll in concurrent degree programs, and enjoy other benefits of the college's association with Syracuse University, but also may take courses at Cornell's state-funded colleges, and at the SUNY Upstate Medical University.

== Postwar boom ==
According to Greene and Barron, "By 1960, the college had become the largest forestry school in the country, with an enrollment exceeding seven hundred students".

== The resuscitation of the American chestnut ==
The United States Forest Service had declared the American chestnut dead and advised that cutting any trees having salvageable lumber. The project was very significant by SUNY ESF is the resuscitation of the American Chestnut tree by Charles Maynard and William Powell using plant tissue culture and genetic engineering techniques to create the Darling 58 chestnut. The SUNY ESF effort is following the trail blazed by plant tissue culture pioneers Gottlieb Haberlandt and Cornell University's Frederick C. Steward.

Unfortunately, as of December 2023 the offspring of the Darling 58 and 54 transgenic American chestnuts have encountered 'headwinds' in field trials.

== Timeline ==
- 1898 - New York State College of Forestry authorized by the New York State Legislature, to be established at Cornell University, in Ithaca
- 1900 - New York State College of Forestry has 24 students
- 1903 - New York State College of Forestry at Cornell University defunded
- 1911 - New York State College of Forestry (re)authorized; first classes under Dr. William L. Bray in basement of Lyman Hall, Syracuse University
- 1912 - New York State Ranger School established at Cranberry Lake, in the Adirondacks, under college administration
- 1917 - First classes at newly opened Bray Hall, the first building at the New York State College of Forestry at Syracuse University
- 1930 - Appropriation for second building at the Syracuse campus signed by Governor Franklin D. Roosevelt
- 1933 - Dedication of Louis Marshall Memorial Hall
- 1948 - New York State College of Forestry at Syracuse University incorporated into the newly formed State University of New York system
- 1972 - Name changed to State University of New York College of Environmental Science and Forestry (SUNY-ESF)
- 2011 - SUNY-ESF commemorates its centennial
- 2012 - SUNY-ESF Ranger School marks 100-year anniversary of its founding

== See also ==
- List of heads of the New York State College of Forestry
- History of Cornell University
- SUNY-ESF Ranger School
- History of Papermaking in New York
- List of historic schools of forestry
