= New York State College of Forestry at Cornell University =

Former forestry college at Cornell University.

Coordinates: 43.034793°N 76.135475°W

The New York State College of Forestry at Cornell University was a statutory college established in 1898 at Cornell University to teach scientific forestry. The first four-year college of forestry in the country, it was defunded by the State of New York in 1903, over controversies involving the college's forestry practices in the Adirondacks. Forestry studies continued at Cornell even after the college's closing.

== Background ==
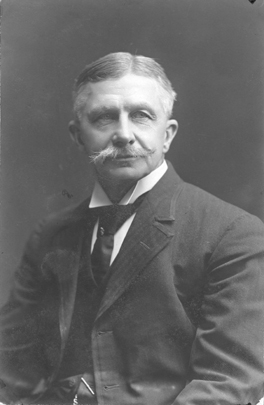
Bernhard Fernow, first Dean of the College

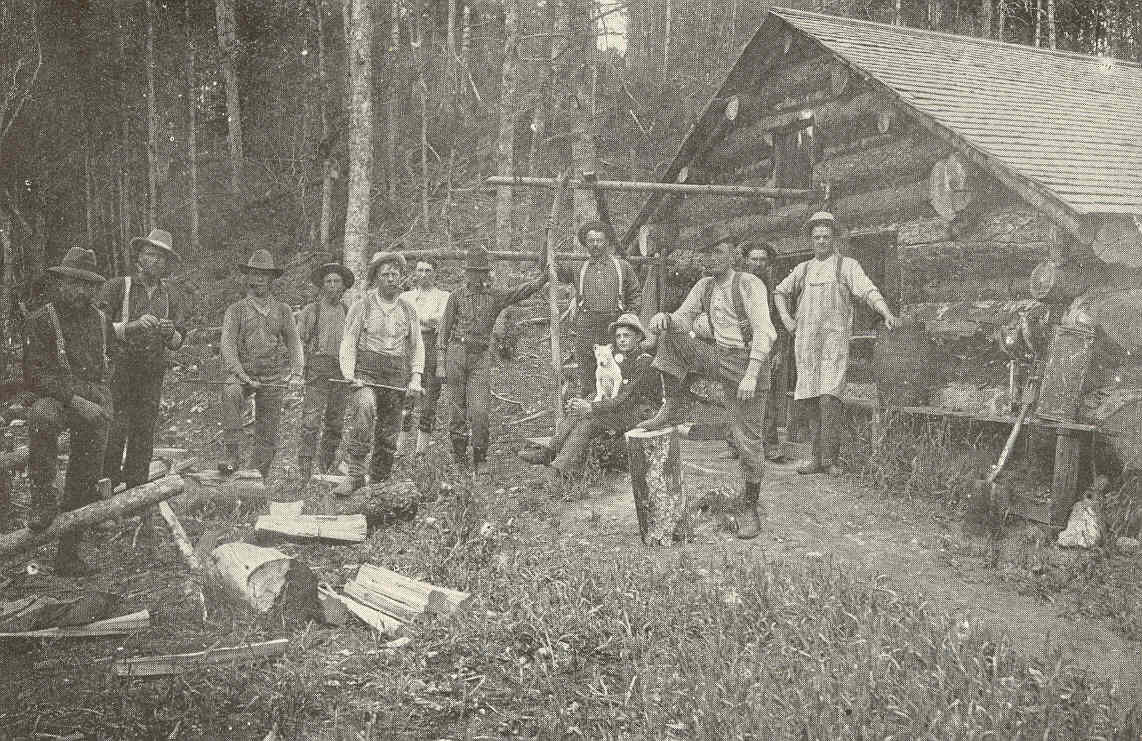
Students and Loggers in Permanent Camp on the Cornell Forest Reserve

The idea of a Cornell Forestry school began with Colonel William F. Fox, Superintendent of New York's state-owned forests during the mid-1890s. At that time, forestry research and education was conducted only in Great Britain and Europe.

When Governor Frank S. Black went on a fishing trip with a Cornell trustee and discussed Col. Fox's proposal, the suggestion was made that Cornell would be well-suited to implement the demonstration forest. Cornell President Jacob Gould Schurman then began lobbying for a state-funded college, just as he had successfully advocated for a state-funded veterinary college in 1894. The legislature quickly approved the new college. The act authorized New York State to pay for a tract of forest land in the Adirondacks from funds, previously appropriated for the acquisition of lands to be held "forever wild" in the Adirondack Forest Preserve, with Cornell holding title, possession, management, and control for 30 years. After 30 years, the land would revert to the State. Schurman recruited German trained, Dr. Bernhard E. Fernow, who was then the 3rd Chief of the U.S. Department of Agriculture's Division of Forestry (predecessor of the U.S. Forest Service) and one of the top forestry experts in the United States, to be the first Dean of the college.

Fernow moved quickly to acquire a tract of land to serve as a demonstration forest and purchased some. Fernow's plan called for clearcutting the forestland at the rate of several thousand acres per year to prepare for planting conifers. He contracted with the Brooklyn Cooperage Company to take the logs and cordwood from the forest land for a 15-year period. In the 1890s, the more valuable red spruce trees had been logged, leaving primarily northern hardwoods. The years 1899, 1903, and 1908 were terrible years for forest fires in the Adirondacks. Many, tens of thousands of acres were consumed by forest fires. Most fires were started by sparks or embers flying from coal-burning locomotive stacks and landing on logging slash. Louis Marshall, with a summer residence at Knollwood Club on Lower Saranac Lake, branded locomotives as "instruments of arson." The worst sin of the lumbermen was the fire menace that they left behind, and which caused incalculable destruction. Nevertheless, Fernow had a 6-mile (9.7 km) long railroad spur built from Axton to Tupper Lake in order to deliver logs to the Brooklyn Cooperage Company facility. The company turned the hardwood logs into barrels and the cordwood into methanol and charcoal, through a process called destructive distillation. Historic charcoal kiln photo:

To his credit, Fernow established the first tree nursery in New York State at Axton, the site of an old lumber settlement originally called Axe-town. But most of the non-native conifer species he planted, such as norway spruce, did not do well for many years, with a denuded area as a result. Smoke from the burning of brush and logging slash, along with Fernow's arrogant disposition toward landowners from nearby Saranac Lake further alienated the public. Fernow's actions drew criticism also from Adirondack guides such as Ellsworth Petty (father of Clarence Petty), who protested the plan and, in a letter writing campaign, successfully lobbied the State to assign a special "Committee of the Adirondacks" to tour the Axton site. In its findings, the commission concluded that "the college has exceeded the original intention of the State when the tract was granted the university for conducting silvicultural experiments."

== Existence ==
In 1898, the New York State College of Forestry opened at Cornell, which was the first forestry college in North America. Because some of the students were transfer students, even though the College had a four-year curriculum, it graduated students during each of the five years of its operation, and the demand for students with Cornell forestry degrees exceeded the supply. It also offered an optional fifth year for a professional masters in forestry degree.

In 1899, Fernow had been recruited as a member of New York's E.H. Harriman expedition to Alaska, along with fellow Cornellian Louis Agassiz Fuertes. The expedition set sail from Seattle on May 31, 1899, aboard the refitted steamer, the George W. Elder. "[Fernow's] research on the expedition was hampered by the fact that the coastal itinerary never gave him a look at the inland forests. His overview thus limited, he concluded that Alaska would never be a great source of timber: the wood was inferior and the conditions of lumbering too difficult. Some say that history has proven him wrong, but his opinion did have an effect: for a time, it discouraged commercial interests from prospecting for timber in the Alaskan forests."

In 1902, Fernow founded and became editor-in-chief of the Journal of Forestry, the pioneering scholarly journal in this field.

The demonstration forest, near Saranac Lake, in the Adirondacks drew heated opposition from neighboring land owners. With an annual state appropriation for the college of only $10,000, Cornell entered into a contract with Brooklyn Cooperage Company for the project to be viable. The contract proved to be profitable and beneficial only for the company. Cornell gained insufficient funds to replant the clear-cut areas. A lawsuit was filed, naming the Brooklyn Cooperage Company as defendant with the People of New York State as plaintiff. (See People v. the Brooklyn Cooperage Company.)

Although the legislature had adopted the 1903 appropriation without debate, Governor Benjamin B. Odell made a pocket veto of funds for the school. In his statement, Governor Odell said: "The operations of the College of Forestry have been subjected to grave criticism, as they have practically denuded the forest lands of the State without compensating benefits. I deem it wise therefore to withhold approval of this item until a more scientific and more reasonable method is pursued in the forestry of the lands now under the control of Cornell University."

=== Notable alumni ===
Notable alumni of the College included:

- Ralph C. Bryant
- Raphael Zon

== Sacrifice of College of Forestry for the College of Agriculture ==
Dean Bailey and Dean Bernhard Fernow, of the Forestry College were the best of friends. In fact, on that night in May 1903 when the telegram arrived announcing Governor Odell's veto of the annual appropriation for the College of Forestry, Bailey and Fernow were together at a dance. Despite the bad news, the dance went on. Fernow did not want to let the veto end his school, and he continued to work without a salary. He proposed continuing the school by charging tuition to the students. (During this time, New York State students attended the College tuition-free.) However, Cornell's Board of Trustees and President Schurman (despite Bailey's urgings to the contrary) decided to close the doors of the Forestry College. In June 1903, instruction in the College ceased and the faculty was dismissed. It was rumored, and with good reason, that a political bargain took place exchanging the College of Forestry, for the establishment of the New York State College of Agriculture at Cornell University in 1904. To quote Liberty Hyde Bailey, "Last winter at Albany I was confronted by inquiries which indicated that the State would be willing to give to either a College of Forestry or a College of Agriculture, but not to both."

Just as the legislative session of 1904 began in Albany, a most unexpected mishap occurred: at a hearing before the Federal Commission on Agriculture in Washington, the Secretary of Agriculture, James Wilson, attacked Cornell for not teaching "Soil Physics" and took the occasion to revive the old canards about Cornell misusing the riches conferred by the Morrill Act. He said of Cornell: "They were better endowed than any institution in the land, yet never did anything." Cornell's President Jacob Gould Schurman demanded a hearing and spoke in Washington with his usual brilliance, refuting the Secretary point by point.

Meanwhile, in Albany, Senator Ed Stewart of Ithaca introduced a bill drafted by Liberty Hyde Bailey, establishing the New York State College of Agriculture at Cornell. Leading the opposition was Chancellor James R. Day of Syracuse University. According to Schurman, "the Chancellor led a pious army, the Methodists of the state. He was an angry man; his words breathe a rancor too hot to be contained by facts." He charged that Ezra Cornell had so "manipulated" the proceeds of the Morrill Act that more than four-fifths were improperly used. He demanded a share in state bounty equal to that accorded Cornell: "Either give to all or not to any!"

Bailey broadcast an immediate refutation, but Chancellor Day had already had his speech published by the Syracuse University Press without change. The Chancellor asked for a hearing before the Assembly's Ways and Means Committee. This request granted, he spoke at the hearing but the chairman and other legislators were insufficiently attentive to him, the Chancellor broke off in a fury and left the room,"before he had adduced a single coherent argument." Dean Bailey, later put up a picture of Chancellor Day, in his office, with the subscription: "Founder of the New York State College of Agriculture at Cornell."

The announcement of the final passage and signing of the bill, in Albany, creating the New York State College of Agriculture at Cornell was met with bonfires and the pealing of church bells in Ithaca. However, the price for this new state support at Cornell was the sacrifice of the New York State College of Forestry at Cornell.

== Aftermath ==
The lawsuit, People v. the Brooklyn Cooperage Company, was decided in favor of the People, and again on appeal in 1906, and the case defined forestry in the United States for a generation. The 30,000 acres (120 km^{2}) of forest lands were placed under the "forever wild" protection of the Adirondack Forest Preserve. At the conclusion of the case, constitutional lawyer Louis Marshall stated, "I hold before me the decision in the case of the People against the Brooklyn Cooperage Company.....the consequence of that was that this 'tremendous' tract of thirty thousand acres was to be cut down 'flat' from one end of it to the other, in order that the scientific foresters might start a new forest which might mature a hundred years from the time that that contract was entered into. This is scientific forestry?".

In 1907, Bernhard E. Fernow became the first professor of forestry in a four-year baccalaureate degree program at Penn State, in State College, after having been the nation's first consulting forester since leaving Cornell and Ithaca in 1903. His office was in New York City. After teaching the 1907 spring semester at Penn State, Dr. Fernow left to become the first head of the Faculty of Forestry at the University of Toronto. He gave as a reason for leaving Penn State his argument with Dr. Joseph Rothrock that Penn State Mont Alto should not have departed from its role as a "ranger school" to pursue higher aspirations. Joseph Rothrock, an explorer, botanist and medical doctor founded the academy Penn State Mont Alto to train men for service in the state forests. It was one of three forestry schools in the nation in 1903, after Yale and Biltmore, respectively.

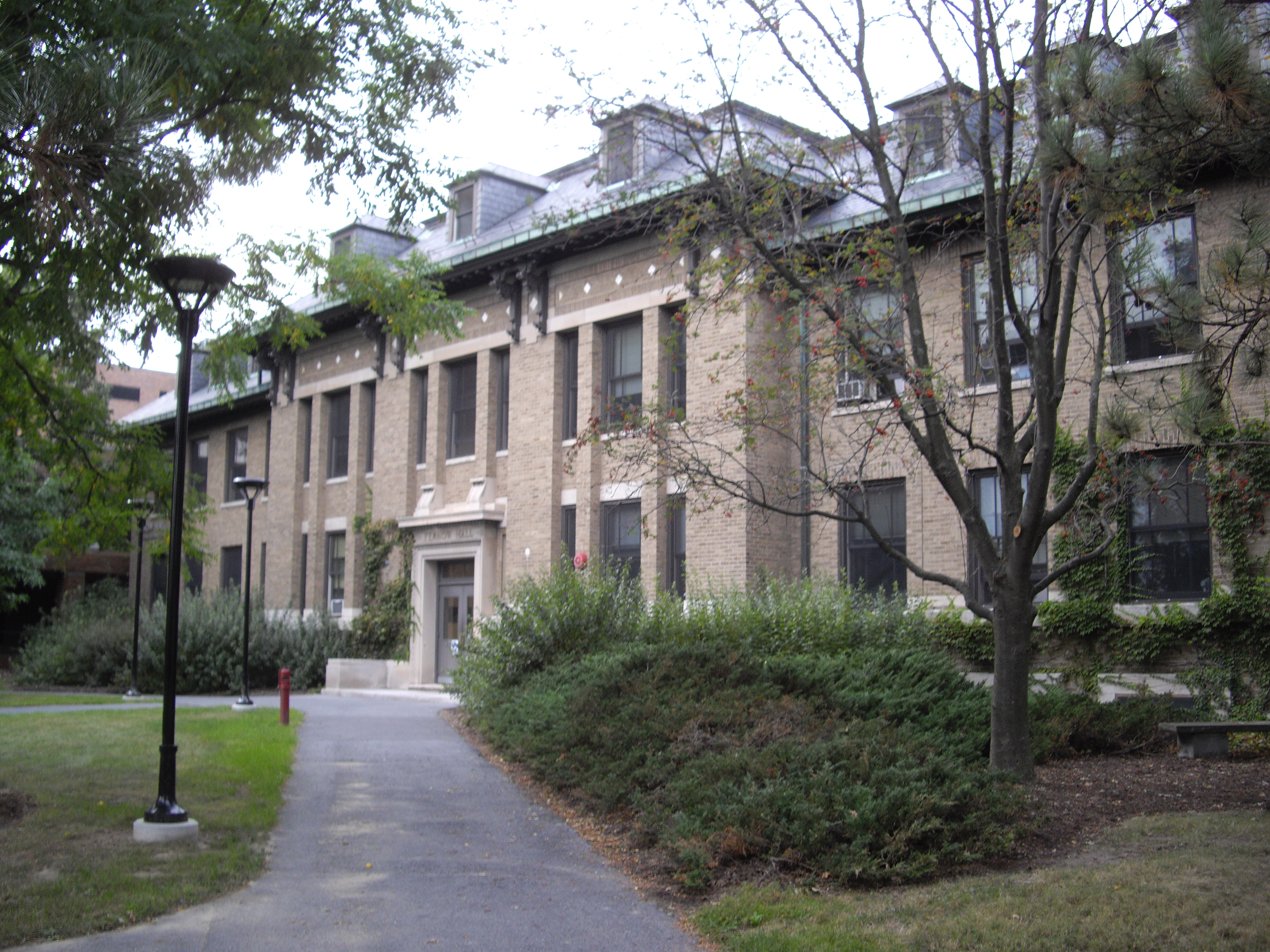
Fernow Hall on the Cornell Campus

In 1910, Liberty Hyde Bailey, the Dean of Cornell's Agriculture College, succeeded in having what remained of the Forestry College transferred to his school. At his request, in 1911, the legislature appropriated $100,000 to construct a building to house the new Forestry Department on the Cornell campus, which Cornell later named Fernow Hall. That Forestry Department continues today as the Department of Natural Resources. In 1927, Cornell established a 1,639-acre (6.63 km^{2}) research forest south of Ithaca, the Arnot Woods.

In 1911, the State Legislature established a New York State College of Forestry at Syracuse University, but not without opposition from Cornell University. In 1930, the NYS Board of Regents questioned the need for duplicate, state-supported forestry programs at Cornell and Syracuse. A formal study resulted in an agreement in 1937 that the Syracuse program would be the only place for professional undergraduate training in forestry. Cornell's Department of Forestry continued with courses in "farm" forestry, to cooperative extension work in forestry, and to research and graduate education. In an exchange, Syracuse University agreed to abandon its School of Agriculture. However, in 2000, SUNY System Administration established ESF's "primacy" among the 64 SUNY campuses and contract colleges for development of new undergraduate degree programs in Environmental Science and Environmental Studies, but ESF does not have a veto power over competing new programs.

== Forestry Studies continue at Cornell ==
Forestry continued at Cornell, with Dean Liberty Hyde Bailey adding a Department of Forestry to the New York State College of Agriculture at Cornell University in 1910–11. Walter Mulford, of the University of Michigan, was appointed as department chair. In 1914, noted forester Ralph Hosmer, a 1902 graduate of the Yale School of Forestry and contemporary of Gifford Pinchot, replaced Mulford as Professor and head of the Department of Forestry at the New York State College of Agriculture at Cornell University, a position he held until his retirement in June 1942.

The world-famous Cornell Lab of Ornithology was the brainchild of Professor Arthur A. Allen, beginning in 1915. Louis Agassiz Fuertes (the son of Cornell's first civil engineering professor, Estevan Antonio Fuertes), America's most famous painter of bird-life, after John James Audubon, taught at Cornell from 1923 until his untimely death in 1927.

Cornell’s vertebrate museum’s fishes collection is particularly strong with great diversity in North American fishes, and minnows in particular. Beginning in the 1940s and continuing into the 1970s the fish collection was greatly expanded thanks to collections made by renowned Cornell ichthyologist Edward Raney and his students.

The Cornell Hortorium founded by Liberty Hyde Bailey in 1935, has historically been the major U. S. center for the systematics of cultivated plants.

Following in the footsteps of the botanist and horticulturist, Liberty Hyde Bailey, a plant physiologist, Frederick Campion Steward, arrived to teach and conduct research at Cornell University in 1950, as Professor of Botany. From his Cornell classrooms and laboratories, Steward was responsible for creating and inspiring a generation of botanists.

In 1978, the Boyce Thompson Institute for Plant Research relocated to the Ithaca campus from its original site in Yonkers, New York.

Today, Cornell University owns 11,000 acres (45 km^{2}) in its home county of Tompkins, including the 4,000-acre (16 km^{2}) "Arnot Forest" for teaching, demonstration, and research; the Uihlein maple syrup research forest near Lake Placid in the Adirondacks; Cornell Botanic Gardens: 200 acres (0.81 km^{2}) on campus, and 4,000 off-campus acres of diverse natural areas; and mineral rights on 420,000 acres (1,700 km^{2}) of land across the United States

Founded in 1972, Cornell Outdoor Education is one of the largest college-based outdoor programs in the country. The Cornell Tree Climbing Institute is a more recent offshoot, having been founded in 2004.

Cornell University was a founding member of the Hubbard Brook Experimental Forest Research Foundation.

On October 28, 2010, an $80 million gift proportions led to the creation of the Atkinson Center for a Sustainable Future at Cornell University, to position the university to be a global leader in the effort to create a sustainable future.

== See also ==
- Cornell University
- History of Cornell University
- People v. the Brooklyn Cooperage Company
- State University of New York College of Environmental Science and Forestry
- François André Michaux laid the foundation for American forestry with his monumental work, The North American Sylva { akin to John James Audubon "The Birds of America"} starting in 1811.
