= People v. Brooklyn Cooperage Co. =

People v. the Brooklyn Cooperage Company was a key early conservation legal battle concerning forestry and logging practices in the Adirondack Park. The case involved the State of New York, Cornell University, constitutional lawyer Louis Marshall, and others in the first decade of the 20th century.

== Background ==
In 1898, the New York State Legislature, responding to an initiative by Colonel William F. Fox, Superintendent of New York's state-owned forests and supported by Governor Frank S. Black, approved by statute the establishment of the New York State College of Forestry at Cornell. The university was granted $165,000 "to purchase 30,000 acres (120 km^{2}) of land in the Adirondack forests for experiments in forestry." Dean Bernhard E. Fernow, formerly Chief of the United States Department of Agriculture's Division of Forestry, recruited to head the new college, moved quickly to establish a demonstration forest on the site, near Axton, New York, the site of an old lumber town originally called Axe-town, in Franklin County.

Fernow's plan called for clearcutting the tract over a 15-year period, followed by the replanting of conifers. With an annual state appropriation for the college of only $10,000, Cornell entered into a contract with the Brooklyn Cooperage Company for the project to be viable. Under terms of the contract, Cornell "reserved for its own use only 1,500 acres and agreed to sell to the company for its business purposes one-fifteenth of the timber on the rest of the land every year for fifteen years." (In the 1890s, the more valuable red spruce trees had been logged, leaving primarily northern hardwoods.) Fernow had a 6-mile (9.7 km)-long railroad spur built from Axton to Tupper Lake in order to deliver logs to the company's facility. Brooklyn Cooperage turned the hardwood logs into barrels and the cordwood into methanol and charcoal, through a process called destructive distillation.

The contract proved to be profitable and beneficial for the company only. To his credit, Fernow established the first tree nursery in New York State at Axton. But Cornell gained insufficient funds from the relationship to fully replant the clear-cut areas. Most of the non-native conifer species that were planted, such as Scots pine and Norway spruce, did not do well for years, with a denuded area resulting.

== Rise of opposition ==
The demonstration forest, near Saranac Lake, in the Adirondacks drew heated opposition from neighboring land owners. Smoke from the burning of brush and logging slash, along with Fernow's disposition toward landowners from nearby Saranac Lake further alienated the public.

Fernow's actions drew criticism also from Adirondack guides such as Ellsworth Petty (father of Clarence Petty), who protested the plan and, in a letter writing campaign, successfully lobbied the State to assign a special "Committee of the Adirondacks" to tour the Axton site. In its findings, the commission concluded that "the college has exceeded the original intention of the State when the tract was granted the university for conducting silvicultural experiments."

== Lawsuit, decision and appeal ==
The New York State College of Forestry at Cornell was closed in 1903. "The Brooklyn Cooperage Company, however, attempted to hold [Cornell] university to its fifteen-year contract for the delivery of a certain amount of lumber. Consequently suit was brought by the people against the company, with the university impleaded, to have the contract annulled."

During the trial, a forester on Chief Pinchot's staff, Charles S. Chapman, testified on behalf of the plaintiff. He stated that between the two silvicultural methods that might have been adopted—the "selection system" of choosing individual trees for felling or the "clear cutting" and replanting system—"Fernow had erred in changing to the clear cutting and replanting method." In its judgment, "the lower court [found] for the people", against Brooklyn Cooperage.

Not satisfied with the judgment against it, Brooklyn Cooperage appealed the case to the New York State Supreme Court. "Edward M. Shepard appeared for the cooperage company and Edward B. Whitney for the people." On July 12, 1906, the defendant lost again. With "Judge Kruse [writing] the opinion ... concurred in by all his colleagues", the Appellate Division of the Supreme Court of New York "upheld the judgment of the lower court ... but granted leave to the cooperage company to plead again upon payment of the costs..."

Upon learning of the higher court's decision, Louis Marshall wrote, "I hold before me the decision in the case of the People against the Brooklyn Cooperage Company ... the consequence of that [contract] was that this 'tremendous' tract of thirty thousand acres was to be cut down 'flat' from one end of it to the other, in order that the scientific foresters might start a new forest which might mature a hundred years from [when the] contract was entered into. This is scientific forestry?"

== Implications ==
The lawsuit and its aftermath defined forestry in the United States for a generation. The 30,000 acres (120 km^{2}) of forest lands were placed under the "forever wild" protection of the Adirondack Forest Preserve.

== See also ==
- Adirondack Park
- Bernhard Fernow
- History of the New York State College of Forestry
- Louis Marshall
- New York State College of Forestry at Cornell
