= William L. Bray =

American academic (1865–1953)

William L. Bray (September 19, 1865 in Burnside, Illinois–1953) was an American botanist, plant ecologist, biogeographer and Professor of Botany at Syracuse University. He was the first dean of the New York State College of Forestry at Syracuse University, from 1911 to 1912.

In 1898, Bray received his PhD from the University of Chicago. In 1907, he was made head of the Botany Department at Syracuse, and in 1908 started teaching a forestry course in the basement of Lyman Hall. Dr. Bray was an associate of Gifford Pinchot. In 1911, in addition to assuming the deanship of forestry he organized the Agricultural Division at Syracuse University.

Bray published The Development of the Vegetation of New York State in 1915. The same year, he became one of the founding members—along with Raphael Zon and James W. Toumey—of the Ecological Society of America. In 1950, the 1917 "activist wing" of that Society formed today's The Nature Conservancy. Bray remained at Syracuse University until 1943, as Chair of Botany and later as Dean of the Graduate School.
