= Ralph C. Bryant =

American professor of forestry (1877-1939)

Ralph Clement Bryant, Sr. (22 January 1877 – February 1, 1939) was an early American professor of forestry, the author of the pioneer textbook and other books and notes in forestry. Logging (1913)

== Education and career ==
R. C. Bryant was the first person to receive a forestry degree in the United States, as a graduate from the New York State College of Forestry at Cornell (1900, Forest Engineer degree).

His positions include: Forester of New York State Forest, Fish and Game Commission (1900–1901), Assistant Chief Forester of Philippine Bureau of Forestry (1902–1905), U.S. Forest Service (1905–1906), Professor of Lumbering, Yale University (1906–1939).
