= Bernhard Fernow =

American forester (1851–1923)

Bernhard E. Fernow
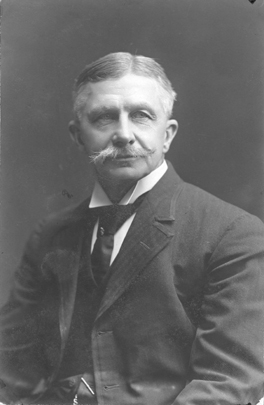
- Born: January 7, 1851; Inowrocław, Province of Posen, Kingdom of Prussia
- Died: February 6, 1923 (aged 72); Toronto, Ontario, Canada
- Citizenship: Prussian, American
- Education: University of Königsberg; Prussian Forest Academy at Münden
- Scientific career
- Fields: Forestry
- Workplaces: U.S. Division of Forestry (USDA); Cornell University; University of Toronto

Bernhard Eduard Fernow (/ˈfɜːrnaʊ/ FUR-now; January 7, 1851 – February 6, 1923) was the third chief of the U.S. Department of Agriculture's Division of Forestry of the United States from 1886 to 1898, preceding Gifford Pinchot in that position, and laying much of the groundwork for the establishment of the United States Forest Service in 1905. Fernow's philosophy toward forest management may be traced to Heinrich Cotta's preface to Anweisung zum Waldbau (Instruction in Silviculture) or Linnaeus' ideas on the "economy of nature." Fernow has been called the "father of professional forestry in the United States."

== Early life and education ==
Fernow was born in Hohensalza (Inowrocław) in the Prussian Province of Posen, in what is now Poland. He spent time with his uncle, who managed the estate of his extended family. After finishing his secondary studies, Fernow spent a year in the Prussian forest service. He then studied at the University of Königsberg and the Royal Prussian Academy of Forestry at Münden, his studies being interrupted for military service in the Franco-Prussian War. Before graduating from college, he met Olivia Reynolds, an American woman accompanying her brother during his studies in Germany. They got engaged, and he followed her to the United States. Married in 1879, the couple had five children. Olivia actively helped him in the many aspects of his work.

== Career ==
He emigrated to the United States in 1876, leaving an upset family in Germany who had been expecting him to manage the family estate. He found little market in the United States for his skills as a professional forester, and worked various odd jobs until 1878 when he got a job in Pennsylvania managing the 15,000 acres of woods which were used to obtain charcoal for the foundry of Cooper-Hewitt and Co. Fernow's observation and works like Report on the Forests of North America (Charles S. Sargent, 1884) showed him the need for proper forest management in the U.S., and he lectured on the subject. Through his job and trade connections, he got to know Abram S. Hewitt, who was influential in President Grover Cleveland's decision to give Fernow a senior position in the Department of Agriculture.

=== USDA Division of Forestry ===
Fernow became chief of the United States Department of Agriculture's Division of Forestry in 1886. His main policy goals were the establishment of a national forest system and introduction of scientific forest management. He produced many scientific reports while working toward the creation of national forests to protect watersheds. Displays that Fernow prepared for the forestry exhibit at the 1893 Chicago World's Fair played a prominent role in generating public support for establishing a Prussian-style national forest service and system for educating professional foresters in the United States.

=== Cornell University ===
In 1898 Fernow left the Division of Forestry to become the first dean of the New York State College of Forestry at Cornell, the first four-year forestry school in the United States. The program's life was short, being closed in 1903 following a veto of state appropriations by New York governor Benjamin Barker Odell, Jr. in response to a conflict over the direction and management of the School's experimental forest in Franklin County, New York. In his veto message Governor Odell said: "The operations of the College of Forestry have been subjected to grave criticism, as they have practically denuded the forest lands of the State without compensating benefits. I deem it wise therefore to withhold approval of this item until a more scientific and more reasonable method is pursued in the forestry of the lands now under the control of Cornell University."

As the university's director, Fernow played a central role in this controversy. He had organized a plan to demonstrate how the northern hardwood forests of the area, which had previously been logged of their large spruce and white pine timber by former owners, the Santa Clara Lumber Company, could be replanted with higher-value conifers, especially white pine. The plan drew criticism from adjacent landowners who successfully lobbied the State to oppose it because it involved clearcutting a total of 30,000 acres (120 km^{2}) of forestland at the rate several thousand acres per year to prepare for planting conifers. Smoke from the burning of brush and logging slash, along with Fernow's arrogant disposition toward landowners from nearby Upper Saranac Lake further alienated the public.

In 1899, 1903, and 1908, forest fires inflicted damage in the Adirondacks, consuming tens of thousands of acres. Most fires were started by sparks flying from coal-burning locomotive stacks and landing on logging slash. Louis Marshall, with a summer residence at Knollwood Club on Saranac Lake, branded locomotives as "instruments of arson." The worst sin of the lumbermen was the fire menace that they left behind, and which caused incalculable destruction. Nevertheless, Fernow had a 6-mile (9.7 km) long railroad spur built from Axton to Tupper Lake in order to deliver logs to the Brooklyn Cooperage Company facility. The management plan had the backing of Cornell's president Schurman, and was found to be technically sound, if imperfectly carried out, by Fernow's contemporaries who practiced forestry in Europe and America. Still, the controversy resulted in Fernow's most notable professional failure, and has been seen in retrospect as evidence of his weakness at operating in the public arena to gain public and political support for forest management.

=== Subsequent positions ===
In 1907, he became the first professor of forestry in a four-year baccalaureate degree program at the Pennsylvania State University, in State College. After teaching the 1907 spring semester at Penn State, Fernow left to become the first head of the Faculty of Forestry at the University of Toronto. He gave as a reason for leaving Penn State an argument with Joseph Rothrock, head of the Pennsylvania State Forest Academy, over the future of that school.

In 1907, Fernow became the founding Dean of the University of Toronto's Faculty of Forestry, Canada's first university school devoted to forest science. He served as editor-in-chief of the Journal of Forestry, which he had started at Cornell in 1902, until his death in 1923. He became a member of the Commission of Conservation of Canada on its organization in 1910.

== Harriman Expedition ==
In 1899, Fernow was recruited as a member of New York's E. H. Harriman expedition to Alaska along with fellow Cornell University alumnus Louis Agassiz Fuertes. The expedition set sail from Seattle on May 31, 1899 aboard the refitted steamer, the George W. Elder. "His research on the expedition was hampered by the fact that the coastal itinerary never gave him a look at the inland forests. His overview thus limited, he concluded that Alaska would never be a great source of timber: the wood was inferior and the conditions of lumbering too difficult. Some say that history has proven him wrong, but his opinion did have an effect: for a time, it discouraged commercial interests from prospecting for timber in the Alaskan forests."

== Legacy ==
Fernow's reputation and legacy may have suffered because of the success and efforts of Pinchot and others who did not share Fernow's Prussian-style vision for professional forestry in America; Nonetheless, Fernow was among the pioneers of forestry education in America. The curriculum he set up at Cornell served as the model for professional forestry programs in North America.

- Fernow's most enduring contributions were his work on the Forest Reserve Act of 1891 and the Organic Act of 1897 for the United States Congress.
- The Journal of Forestry, now official publication of the Society of American Foresters, continues publication to this day.
- Mount Fernow, the eighth highest mountain in Washington state, in Chelan County, was named for Bernhard Fernow by Albert H. Sylvester. According to the Washington Placenames database, there is second, smaller Mount Fernow, in King County; and a series of five lakes in Washington state, also named after Fernow.
- Fernow Hall at Cornell University was built in 1912 and named after Fernow.
- The Fernow Experimental Forest, a 4,700-acre (19 km^{2}) outdoor laboratory and classroom run by the United States Forest Service, was established in 1934 near Parsons, West Virginia and named for Fernow.
- A plaque honoring Fernow is placed at 44.253°N 74.343°W within Fernow Forest, a 68-acre (27.5 ha) remnant of the plantings from the failed experimental forest in what is now the Adirondack Park. A self-guided nature trail can be followed through the forest that includes specimens of Eastern White Pine and Norway Spruce planted as a part of the Cornell Demonstration Forest.

== Works ==
- The White Pine (1899)
- Report upon Forestry Investigations of the United States Department of Agriculture 1877-98 (1899)
- Economics of Forestry (1902)
- History of Forestry (1907)
- The Care of Trees (1911)

In addition, he issued many other official reports and bulletins as part of his work for the USDA.

== See also ==
- History of papermaking in New York
- History of the New York State College of Forestry
- New York State College of Forestry at Cornell
