= Hosmer's Grove =

Hiking trail in Hawaii, United States

Coordinates: 20.77139°N 156.24056°W

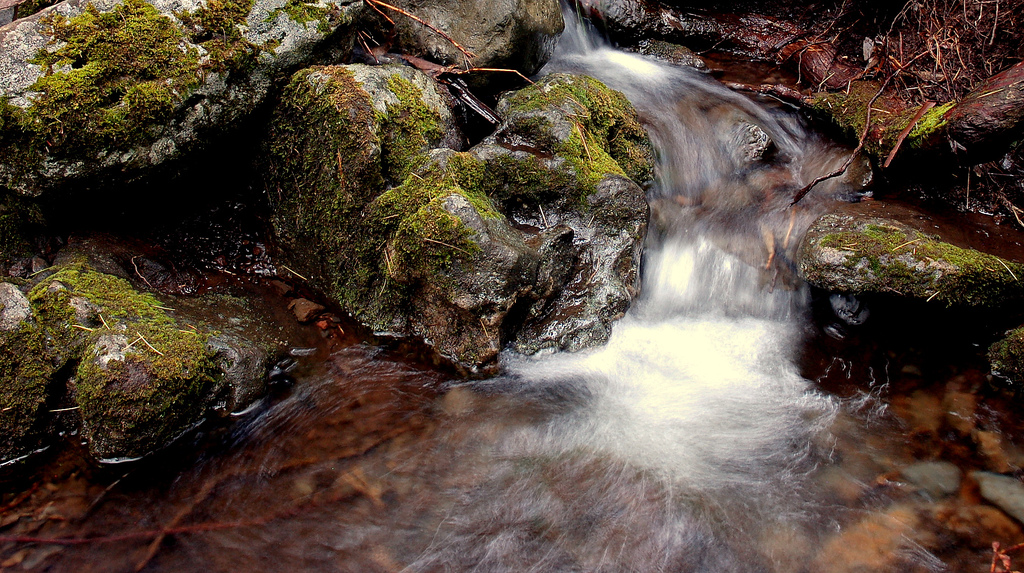
A stream flowing through Hosmer's Grove

Hosmer's Grove is an example of experimental forestation from Hawaii's territorial days. Located just inside Haleakala National Park near the summit of Haleakala in Maui, Hawaii, it includes a campsite and several hiking trails. The grove is well known amongst birdwatchers due to the abundance of endemic honeycreepers at the site, including Iiwi, Apapane, Hawaii Amakihi, and the Maui Alauahio.

== History ==
Hawaii's first territorial forester, Ralph Hosmer, imported tree species from around the world in hopes of creating a viable timber industry. In 1927 he began planting stands of pine, spruce, cedar and eucalyptus at this site, which can still be seen today in the grove. Only 20 of the 86 species introduced survived: those with shallow roots were blown down in storms, others found the soil chemistry or fungi unsuitable for growth or reproduction. A few thrived, escaping from Hosmer's experimental forest. The Mexican weeping pine (Pinus patula), Monterey pine (Pinus radiata), and eucalyptus have become aggressive invaders and are now recognized threats to the native ecosystems within Haleakala National Park.

== Park ==
Haleakala National Park was established in 1916 to preserve the native flora and fauna and the outstanding geological resources found within the summit's crater-like depression. Alien plants and animals introduced by humans present a difficult challenge. Today the park's resource managers are reclaiming remnants of the native shrubland around Hosmer Grove by removing thousands of invasive trees and grasses. Without the removal of adult seed-bearing plants and their rapidly spreading seedlings, an alien forest would soon overrun the native shrubland between here and the crater, thereby erasing a fragile Hawaiian ecosystem that has taken millions of years to develop.

== Grove ==
Forestry - Years of clearing the land for cultivation and ranching have taken their toll. By the early 1900s removal of native forests had led to erosion and drought. Ralph Hosmer established forest reserves throughout the islands. He experimented with 86 species of trees on Maui, such as eucalyptus, hoping to improve the watershed, and provide building lumber and fuel for the sugar refineries.

Fencing - Near the trail is a fence which was built to keep goats and pigs out of the Park. Because Hawaii is over 2,000 miles (3,200 km) from the nearest continent, all land mammals found in Hawaii today, except the winged Hawaiian hoary bat, have been introduced by people. These alien animals destroy fragile native plants which evolved without the presence of browsing mammals. Look at the native plants around you and try to see them as a pig or goat would. Except for the heath-like pukiawe, most of these plants are easy food for grazing animals. When the ancestors of these plants arrived in Hawaii millennia ago, there were no grazing animals. As plants adapted to their surroundings, they lost defenses they no longer needed, such as poison, thorns, and scent. Fencing protects native plants from grazing pigs and goats.

Gentle thorns - Beneath the alien trees are 'akala (Rubus hawaiensis), or Hawaiian raspberry. In the summer you may find deep-red fruit among the broad leaves. The branches have only small hair-like thorns, having lost the need for defensive thorns, until grazing mammals were brought in.

Native seeds - You may see berries and seed pods on many of the shrubs along the trail. Although these berries are eaten by the native and alien birds, many of them can make people quite ill. Seeds from these shrubs have trouble sprouting amid the thick alien grasses.

Overlook - As you sit amid the 'iliahi (Santalum haleakalae) and other native shrubs, notice how each has evolved ways of withstanding the often intense conditions on the mountain. The large gnarled trees growing up from the gulch are the native 'ohia, you may see red bottle-brush shaped flowers on them. Hawaiian honeycreepers dip their curved beaks into these flowers for nectar, and in doing so pollinate the flowers. This active interdependence highlights the need for preserving all elements of a forest, and not just the tree.

Germination - Some seeds from native shrubs have tough outer hulls and botanists were unable to make them germinate. But a researcher found that from the dropping of the chukar partridge and the Chinese ring-neck pheasant seedlings emerge. These alien birds appear to be benefiting the native plants by breaking down the seed hull, and taking the place of a native seed eating bird which is probably now extinct. However, chukar and common pheasant can adversely impact native bird populations by serving as disease reservoirs.

Adaptation - The Hawaiian Islands emerged from the sea millions of years ago and a colonizing plant managed to become established once every 100,000 years. Plants got to Hawaii via the three W's: wind, bird wings or waves. After arriving, they evolved to take advantage of a variety of new habitats. A single colonizing ancestor often changed or developed into many new endemic species; this is known as adaptive radiation. There are more than 10,000 species of endemic Hawaiian plants, birds and insects. But sadly, with this great diversity comes great loss. Nearly 75% of our nation's documented plant and bird extinctions were endemic Hawaiian species.

The silver geranium - Hinahina, the silver geranium, can be seen growing along the trails at Hosmer's Grove. With its silvery tridentate leaves and small whitish flowers, hinahina is endemic to Haleakala. It is found nowhere else on earth. Its silver, slightly tomentose (hairy) leaves protect it from the relentless sun, wind, and extreme temperatures found near the summit.

Biodiversity - The native shrublands support a large diversity of life, unlike the understory of this pine and eucalyptus forest. Notice as you walk under the Norway spruce ahead that there are few other plants which can survive being deprived of sunlight and inhibited by plant chemicals.

== Hike ==
This half-mile trail will lead you on a 30-minute walk through one of the biological battlegrounds of the Park. The trail begins in the shade of a 20th-century alien forest and ends in native Hawaiian shrubland that looks as it did centuries ago. Numbered posts and plaques are found along the trail.

This trail continues on a l/4 mile loop into the native shrubland; turning right will take you back to the parking lot. Looking across the gulch you see a mixture of native trees, shrubs and ferns. The larger 'ohia (Metrosideros polymorpha), koa, and olapa are still found in remote gulches, but covered much of the lower mountainside just a century ago. The native forests are a vital part of the watershed, drawing clouds and rain to the mountain, and controlling erosion.

From here the trail leaves the shrubland and returns through Hosmer Grove to the parking area.
