= Raphael Zon =

Russian-American forestry researcher

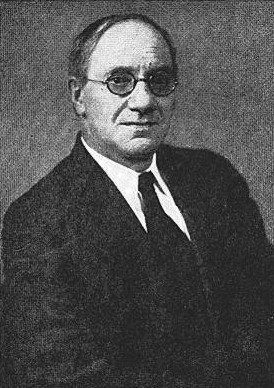
- Raphael Zon, c. 1925
- Born: December 1, 1874; Simbirsk, Russia
- Died: October 27, 1956 (aged 81)
- Citizenship: United States (naturalized)
- Education: Kazan University; Cornell University
- Known for: First attempt of a systematic inventory of the Earth's forests; first complete map of native vegetation of United States; Technical Director, Prairie States Forestry Project; pioneered studies of the relation of forests to streams and flooding
- Spouse: Anna Puziriskaya
- Awards: Gifford Pinchot Medal
- Scientific career
- Fields: Forestry
- Workplaces: United States Forest Service

Raphael Zon (December 1, 1874 – October 27, 1956) was a prominent U.S. Forest Service researcher.

== Early life ==
Raphael Zon was born in Simbirsk in the Russian Empire in 1874, to parents Gabriel Zon and Eugenia Berliner. A schoolmate of Lenin's, he fled Russia in 1896 while on bail following arrest for organizing a trade union. Zon and companion Anna Puziriskaya, whom he would later marry, fled to Belgium where he studied in Liège. He spent nine months in London before emigrating to the United States in 1898.

== Education ==
Zon's early studies were in Russia. He attended the "classical gymnasium" in Simbirsk, and, studying "medical and natural sciences," graduating from the Kazan Imperial University with a bachelor's degree in "comparative embryology". In the United States, Zon studied forestry under Bernhard Fernow, Filibert Roth and others at the New York State College of Forestry at Cornell University in Ithaca, New York, earning a professional degree of Forest Engineer (F.E.) in the college's first graduating class in 1901.

== Career ==
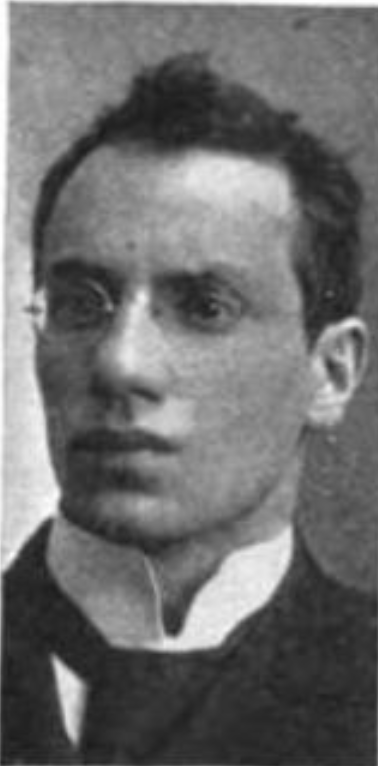
Zon in 1906

Upon graduation, he went to work for the U.S. Forest Service, where his career spanned 43 years as a forest researcher. Zon was a protégé' of both Dr. Bernhard Fernow and Gifford Pinchot, first Chief of the United States Forest Service, and a close friend of Bob Marshall in the 1930s.

Zon made significant contributions to forestry literature. Many of his more than 200 scientific publications have been translated into Russian, French, German, and Japanese. With Bernard Fernow, Zon helped establish American forestry’s professional periodical literature. These contributions began when he joined the editorial staff of Forest Quarterly. He deepened his involvement, becoming editor of the Proceedings of the Society of American Foresters in 1905. When Forest Quarterly and Proceedings merged, Zon became one of the founders and the first managing editor of the combined publication, the Journal of Forestry. He served as editor-in-chief of the Journal of Forestry from 1923-28.

Zon was a "giant" among American foresters, or as Secretary of Agriculture Claude R. Wickard said, the "dean of all foresters of America."

== Commemoration ==
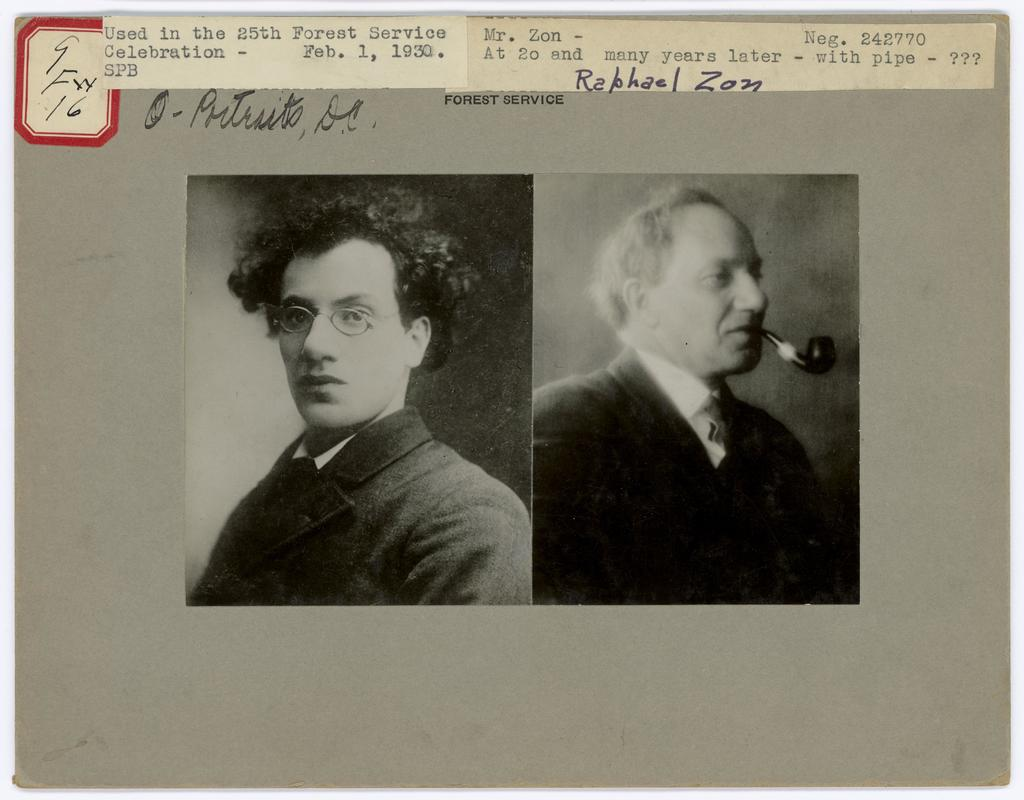
Raphael Zon as a younger man (left) and as an older man

A large stone memorial with plaque commemorating Zon stands at the USDA Cutfoot Sioux Experimental Forest, in Minnesota, near where his ashes were scattered.

== Career ==
- 1901. U.S. Forest Service Student Assistant and assistant to forest investigations in the East
- 1907. Chief, Office of Silvics, later Forest Investigations
- 1920. Special investigations in forest economics
- 1923-1944. Director, Lakes States Forest Experiment Station, St. Paul, Minnesota
- 1923-1928. Director, Cloquet Forest Experiment Station, University of Minnesota
- 1944. Retired, U.S. Forest Service

== Accomplishments ==
- 1908. Proposed the establishment of decentralized U.S. Forest Experiment Stations
- 1914. Charter member, Ecological Society of America
- 1918. National Research Council, Division of Agriculture, Botany, Forestry, Fisheries and Zoology Executive Committee
- 1923-1928. Editor-in-chief, Journal of Forestry
- 1928. International Congress of Soil Science, American vice president of the subcommission of forest soils
- 1930. Charles Lathrop Pack Forest Education Board
- 1940. New York World's Fair "Foreign-born citizens judged to have made the most notable contributions to American democracy in the past 100 years"
- Fellow, Society of American Foresters
- 1952. Gifford Pinchot Medal, Society of American Foresters
- 2005. U.S. Forest Service Centennial Congress Science Leadership Award
- Authored or co-authored roughly 200 articles in professional journals, business and development publications, or popular magazines
