= Jacob Billikopf =

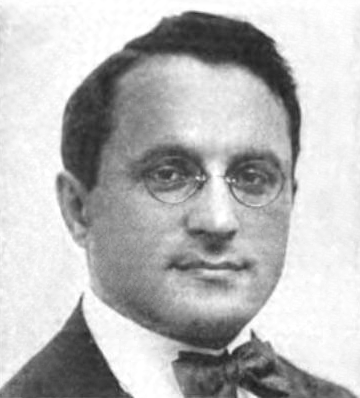
- Born: Jacob Bielikov; June 1, 1882; Vilnius , Russian Empire
- Died: December 31, 1950 (aged 68); Philadelphia, Pennsylvania, United States
- Education: University of Virginia; University of Chicago
- Spouses: Ruth Marshall (m. 1920; died 1936) Esther Freeman (m. 1942)

Jacob Billikopf, Ph.B., L.L.D., (June 1, 1882 – December 31, 1950) was a nationally known figure in social work, Jewish philanthropy and labor arbitration. Billikopf had a long and distinguished career in public service work. He served as superintendent of the United Jewish Charities in Milwaukee, Wisconsin and Kansas City, Missouri, before becoming the executive director of the Federation of Jewish Philanthropies in Philadelphia, Pennsylvania, chairman of the National Labor Board for the Philadelphia region during the first years of the New Deal.

He served as impartial chairman of both the Ladies' Garment industry and the Amalgamated Clothing Workers in Philadelphia. He later represented the department stores of Philadelphia in their labor relations. He was also a member of the board of trustees of the New School for Social Research, and president of the board of trustees of Howard University. In 1937 and 1938 he dedicated himself full-time to bringing European Jewish refugees into the United States. Following World War II he served on the Clemency Board in Washington which was established to review court martial sentences.

== Early life and education ==
The son of Louis (Layzer) Bielikov and Glicke Katzenellenbogen, Billikopf emigrated to the United States from Vilnius, Lithuania (then part of Russia) in 1895 and settled in Richmond, Virginia, where he attended local schools. His intelligence was quickly noted by his teachers, so the majority of his public education was devoted to helping him master the English language. At the age of 15 he became a regular contributor to the Richmond, Virginia weekly publication, The Jewish South, calling himself "Jacob Billikopf (the Russian boy)". He attended the University of Richmond before transferring to the University of Chicago in 1903 where he received his undergraduate degree, Ph.B., Bachelor of Philanthropy. He achieved some fame as a chess prodigy.

== Social service career ==
In 1907, Billikopf moved on to Kansas City, Missouri, where he became superintendent of the United Jewish Charities, while contributing to the establishment of public baths, night schools, a municipal loan agency and free public legal aid. During this period he befriended philanthropist William Volker, when Kansas City was gripped by high unemployment and crime rates, as well as overcrowded jails. Billikopf, Volker, and attorney Frank P. Walsh served on a volunteer, nonpolitical committee dedicated to undertaking action to resolve these social debacles. Their proposal, to create a Board of Pardons and Paroles to supervise the correctional institutions and to handle the pardons and paroles of municipal inmates, was adopted in 1908.

Out of the Board of Pardons and Paroles, in 1910, grew the Board of Public Welfare, the first of its kind in the country. Billikopf was a board member and Volker the president. The board oversaw provision of social services and family aid, free legal advice, a loan agency and the inspection of factories and work places. Beginning in 1913, when he was only thirty, he was included in Who's Who In America.

In 1914, the NAACP recruited Billikopf and other Jewish leaders for its board.

In 1916 Billkopf was elected President of the National Association of Jewish Workers.

In 1917 Billikopf left Kansas City and came to New York City where he became the executive director of the American Jewish Relief Committee which raised $20,000,000 for the aid of displaced European Jews after World War I.

In 1920 he settled in Philadelphia, where he became the first full-time Director of the Federation of Jewish Charities, known today as the Jewish Federation of Greater Philadelphia. He also held positions with many public and private welfare agencies, most notably as president of the National Conference of Jewish Social Service. He was also prominent in labor relations in Philadelphia, one year settling more than 80 major labor disputes. While in Philadelphia, he married Ruth Marshall, daughter of famed Jewish leader and lawyer, Louis Marshall.
