= Fernow Hall (Ithaca, New York) =

- U.S. National Register of Historic Places
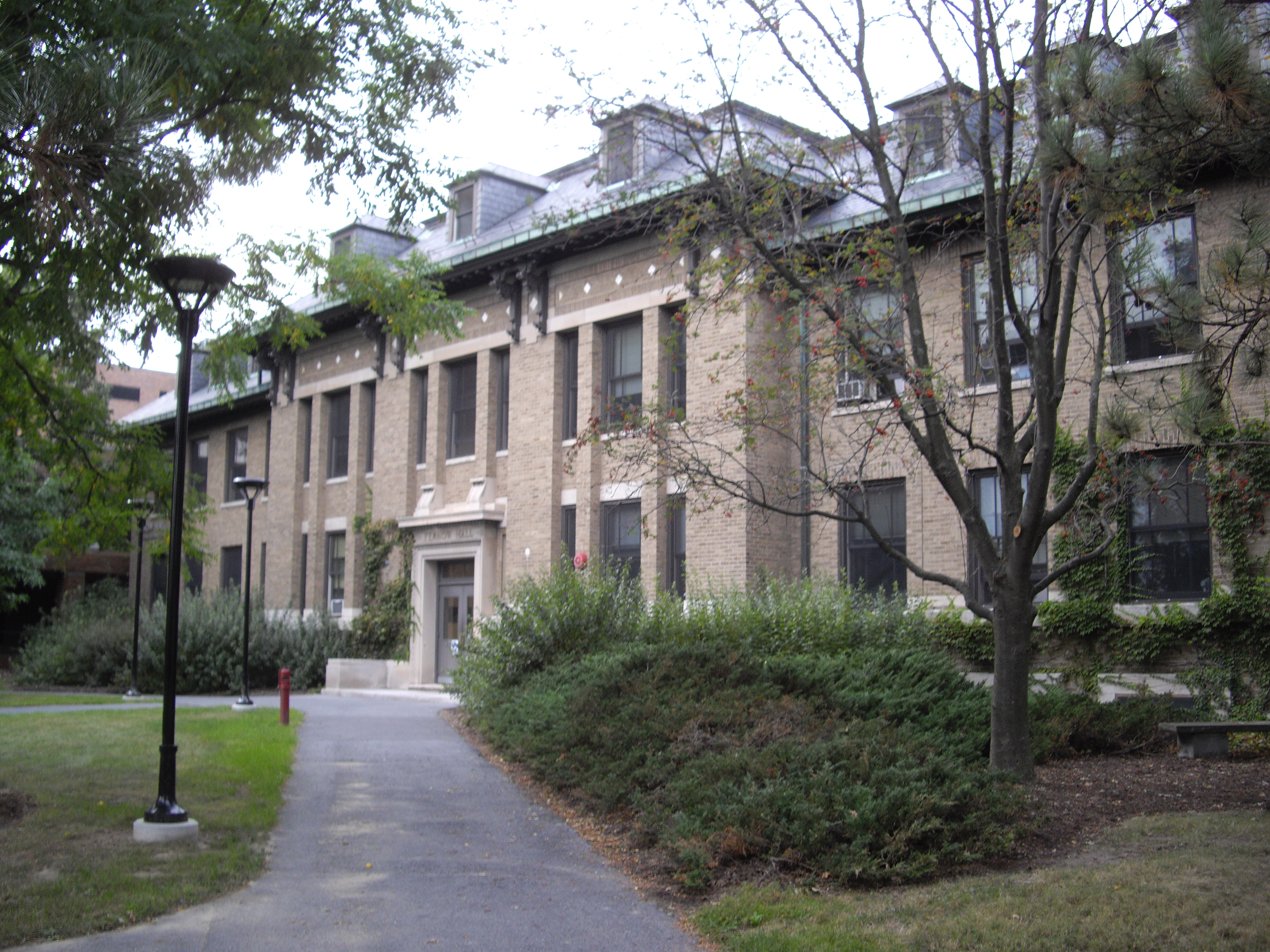

- Location within New York Location within the United States
- Location: Ithaca, New York
- Coordinates: 42°26′55.38″N 76°28′32.69″W
- Area: 29,501 sq ft
- Built: 1912
- Architect: Green & Wicks; Durolithic Co.
- Architectural style: Prairie School
- MPS: New York State College of Agriculture TR
- NRHP reference No.: 84003183
- Added to NRHP: September 24, 1984

Fernow Hall is an early twentieth century Cornell University building, that was listed on the National Register of Historic Places in 1984. It currently houses the Department of Natural Resources. It is named in honor of Bernhard Fernow, who was the only Dean during the five-year history of the New York State College of Forestry at Cornell. It was designed by Green and Wicks in the Colonial Revival style and constructed in 1915.
