= Louis Marshall =

American lawyer and Jewish leader (1856–1929)

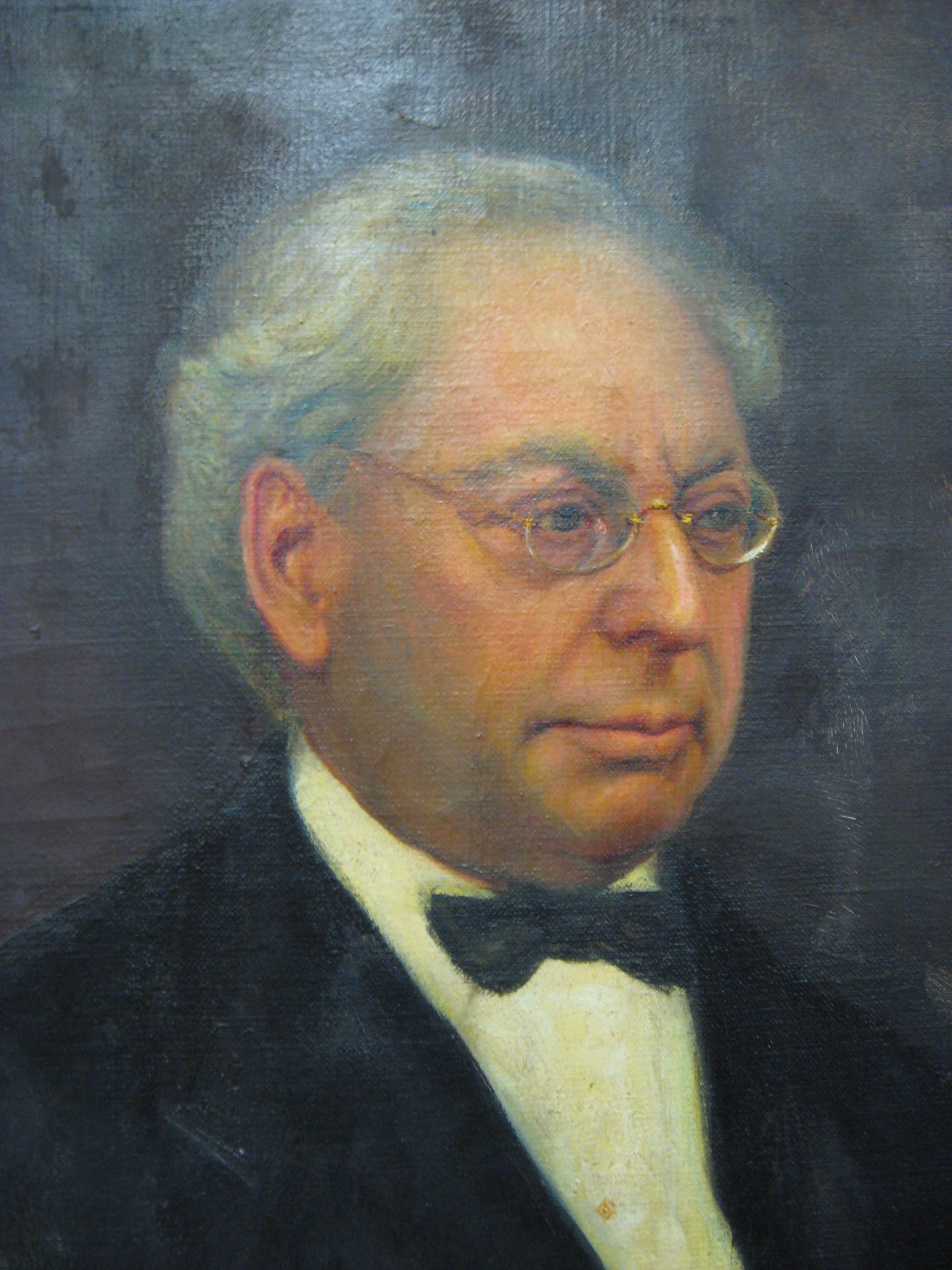
- c. 1915
- Born: December 14, 1856; Syracuse, New York, U.S.
- Died: September 11, 1929 (aged 72); Zurich, Switzerland
- Education: Columbia Law School
- Occupation: Lawyer
- Spouse: Florence Lowenstein
- Children: James Marshall; Ruth Marshall; Bob Marshall; George Marshall

Louis Marshall (December 14, 1856 – September 11, 1929) was an American corporate, constitutional and civil rights lawyer as well as a mediator and Jewish community leader who worked to secure religious, political, and cultural freedom for all minority groups. Among the founders of the American Jewish Committee (AJC), he defended Jewish and minority rights. He was also a conservationist, and the force behind re-establishing the New York State College of Forestry at Syracuse University, which evolved into today's State University of New York College of Environmental Science and Forestry (ESF).

== Early life and education ==
Louis Marshall was born on December 14, 1856, in Syracuse, New York, to two Jewish immigrants, recently arrived from Germany. Founded just eight years earlier, in 1847, Syracuse was a booming transportation, financial, and manufacturing hub on the Erie Canal, as the United States expanded West. On the brink of the American Civil War, the city was also a well-known stop on the Underground Railroad.

Marshall's father, Jacob Marshall, had arrived in New York City at 19 years of age on September 1, 1849, from Neidenstein, Bavaria, in Germany; his mother arrived from Württemberg, Germany, in 1853. According to Louis Marshall, the family name had been spelled "Marschall", with a "c", in "Rhenish Bavaria ... near the French boundary". Marshall's friend and colleague, Cyrus Adler noted in his remembrances of Marshall that the latter's "father migrated to the United states in 1849, the year which marked the beginning of migration from Germany following the failure of the revolutionary movements of 1848." From New York City, Jacob Marshall had "worked his way up the Erie Canal to Syracuse, where he opened a hide, fur, and leather business. It was marginally profitable."

Louis was the eldest of six children. He had one brother, Benjamin, two years younger, and four sisters: Marie, Bertha, Clara, and Ida; 13 years separated Louis and his youngest sister, Ida. The family resided at 222 Cedar Street, "in the old Seventh Ward of Syracuse", an area today approximately where the Onondaga County Justice Center (county jail) is located.

From childhood, Marshall was both a scholar and a linguist. His first language was German: "I spoke German before I knew a word of English, and so long as my mother lived (she died in 1910) I never spoke to her otherwise than in German." Louis' mother, Zilli (or Zella), was "well educated for her times ... reading to [her children] in German, Schiller, Scott and Hugo, the standard literature of mid-century."

Marshall attended "the Seventh Ward Public school" and later Syracuse High School, from which he graduated in 1874, one of eight males in a graduating class of 22. In addition he attended German and Hebrew schools along with his sisters. In his various school settings, Marshall applied himself to studying French, German, Latin, Greek and Hebrew. The latter he also learned from his father. Later in life, Marshall taught himself Yiddish.

Upon high school graduation, Marshall "began the study of law, in accordance with the fashion of that day, in a lawyer's office, that of Nathaniel B. Smith", where he served a two-year apprenticeship. This under his belt, his next step towards a career in law was to "enroll in Columbia University's law school (then Dwight Law School)". According to Marshall, "I really do not know if I am considered an alumnus of the Law School at Columbia University or not. If I am, then it is very peculiar that it has not been until I arrived at the mature age of seventy-two that I should have received a letter which is addressed to me as a 'Dear Fellow Alumnus'. I attended the Law School from September, 1876, to June, 1877. ... I never received a degree because two years actual attendance was required."

== Career ==
=== Lawyer ===
After completing his legal studies on January 1, 1878, Marshall joined the law firm of William C. Ruger in Syracuse. A few years later, in 1885, he became a member of the New York State Bar Association. According to Adler, "the day he was admitted to the Bar, Marshall became a partner in Ruger's firm". Later, when Ruger was appointed chief justice of the New York State Court of Appeals, "the law firm became Jenny, Brooks & Marshall." During this period, Marshall rose to prominence not only in New York, but nationally: "In 1891 he was part of a national delegation that asked President Benjamin Harrison to intervene on behalf of persecuted Russian Jews." Before the age of 40, Marshall had argued over 150 cases before the Court of Appeals.

Marshall was recruited by Samuel Untermyer, a classmate at Columbia, to join the law firm of Guggenheimer and Untermyer in New York City. Moving there in February 1894, he became heavily involved in Jewish religious and political affairs. He also was involved in alternative dispute resolution (ADR), acting with Louis Brandeis as the mediator in a strike of 60,000 to 70,000 cloakmakers in New York City in 1910, and in 1919 was the arbitrator in a clothing-workers' strike.

As his life became stable and more organized he acquired a circle of intimate friends. It was his habit to have lunch and relax at Monch's Restaurant with a group of lawyers during the work-week, where they would debate each other, with Loewenstein, the waiter, serving as Judge and jury.

During the years 1910 and 1911, while William Howard Taft was president, two openings occurred on the United States Supreme Court. Several of Taft's prominent friends urged him to appoint Marshall, who had the reputation of an outstanding Constitutional lawyer and public citizen. A justice of the Supreme Court was the only elected or appointed office Marshall had ever wanted or sought; Taft eventually chose two other men for the positions.

In 1914, he was part of the legal team representing Leo Frank, a Jewish pencil factory manager convicted of raping and murdering a 13-year-old employee named Mary Phagan. Marshall initiated an ultimately unsuccessful appeal of the case to the United States Supreme Court.

Marshall was active in protecting the human and civil rights of Jews and on behalf of the National Association for the Advancement of Colored People (of which he was a director), and fought major legal battles on behalf of all minorities. By the end of his legal career, Marshall had "argue[d] more cases before the U.S. Supreme Court than any other private lawyer of his generation."

The Syracuse Post-Standard's editorial on Marshall, written upon his death in 1929, portrayed his motivation as: "Always, it was justice ... Justice to all who were in need of justice ... justice to the people who, like himself, were of Jewish origin. ... His was an intense Americanism. ... He was a man who helped humanity ... unafraid, a man whose hand was ready to lift a load ... necessary for the lessening of misfortune or oppression, a worker in our common life who because he was a worker, became a leader, a man who crowded his years with service for the benefit of those about him—altogether an eminent American citizen whom a multitude will hold in grateful remembrance."

=== Jewish leader ===
In 1905, Marshall was promoted to chairman of the board of directors of the Jewish Theological Seminary of America, Conservative Judaism's rabbinical school. After serving as an officer for several years at Congregation Emanu-El of the City of New York, a Reform congregation, he became its president in 1916. (Marshall was related by marriage to Emanu-El's spiritual leader, Rabbi Judah L. Magnes, whose wife, Beatrice Lowenstein, was Marshall's sister-in-law.) Despite the implicit contradiction, to Marshall there was only one Judaism.

In 1906, with Jacob Schiff and Cyrus Adler, Marshall helped found the American Jewish Committee (AJC) as a means for keeping watch over legislation and diplomacy relevant to American Jews, and to convey requests, information, and political threats to US government officials. Marshall eventually became the AJC's primary strategist and lobbyist. After being elected its president in 1912, he held the post until his death. In this position, he opposed Congressional bills that would prevent many illiterate Jews from entering the US. Despite a Presidential veto, one of the bills was enacted in 1917, after a Congressional override.

Marshall was a strong advocate of abolishing the literacy test and said, "We are practically the only ones who are fighting [the literacy test] while a 'great proportion' [of the people] is 'indifferent to what is done'". Marshall was also the leader of the movement that led to the abrogation, in 1911, of the US-Russian Commercial Treaty of 1832.

At the end of World War I, Marshall attended the Paris Peace Conference at Versailles, France, in 1919, as President of the American Jewish Committee and Vice-President of the American Jewish Congress. There, he helped formulate clauses for the "full and equal civil, religious, political, and national rights" of Jews in the constitutions of the newly created states of eastern Europe. These provisions Marshall believed to be "the most important contribution to human liberty in modern history."

He fought a proposal to have the US Census Bureau enumerate Jews as a race. Although he had some differences with political Zionists, Marshall contributed to efforts that led to the establishment of Israel as a Jewish homeland in Palestine. He was instrumental in organizing the American Jewish Relief Committee, which brought together Zionists and non-Zionists for the management of Jewish colonization efforts.

In 1920, Marshall also attempted to stop a newspaper owned by Henry Ford, The Dearborn Independent, from spreading anti-Semitic propaganda. Marshall and Untermyer entered the fight against the alleged libelous attacks featured in the paper, which led to a 1927 lawsuit against the automaker in federal court.

=== Public servant ===
Over the course of his career, Marshall served in a variety of notable public service positions, at every level. "In 1890, at the age of thirty-four, he was appointed by Governor Hill to a special commission to revise the judiciary article of the [New York state] constitution ...". In 1894, was elected to serve as delegate to the New York State Constitutional Convention, representing the 24th District.

In 1902, Marshall was appointed chairman of a commission investigating the slum conditions on New York City's Lower East Side, where many Jewish immigrants had settled. In 1908, he was appointed chairman of the New York State Immigration Commission.

In 1910, Marshall was appointed a trustee of Syracuse University. In 1911, he became president of the board of trustees of the New York State College of Forestry at Syracuse University (now the State University of New York College of Environmental Science and Forestry), a post he kept until his death in 1929.

At the New York State Constitutional Convention of 1915, Marshall again served as a delegate, this time being elected to an at-large position. According to Adler, Marshall "was the only man who sat in three [New York state] constitutional conventions ..."

In 1923, Marshall was honored with an appointment as a director of the National Association for the Advancement of Colored People. In that post, "he fought against racial segregation in housing and against the disenfranchisement of the white primary. ... Defending the rights of Negro voters, he secured a ruling of the Supreme Court in the case of Nixon v. Herndon that the Texas white primary law was unconstitutional."

=== Conservationist ===
Marshall had both a public and a personal interest in conservation. In his home state of New York, he spearheaded efforts to protect the Adirondack and Catskill Mountains; at the state's 1894 constitutional convention, he helped establish the New York Forest Preserve.

Louis Marshall was a framer of Article 14, the "Forever Wild" clause, in the New York State constitutional Amendment to the New York State Constitution, which went into effect on January 1, 1895.

The lands of the state, now owned or hereafter acquired, constituting the forest preserve as now fixed by law, shall be forever kept as wild forest lands. They shall not be leased, sold or exchanged, or be taken by any corporation, public or private, nor shall the timber thereon be sold, removed or destroyed.

The devastating forest fires of 1899, in the Adirondack Forest Preserve, which burned 80,000 acres (320 km^{2}) provoked Colonel William F. Fox, Superintendent of New York's state-owned forests, to urge replacing fire wardens with a cadre of professional forest rangers. However, it took more than a decade, the terrible forest fires of 1903 and 1908, and the help of Louis Marshall before the present New York State Forest Ranger system was finally established in 1912. Marshall was also a driving force behind the establishment of the New York State Ranger School in Wanakena, New York, which was founded in 1912, and a similar school was established at Paul Smith's College.

Later, "an ardent conservationist, he fought earnestly every effort to encroach upon the ... Preserve he had helped create. The efforts of highway builders to slash roads through the woods, of power interests to divert the rivers to their own use, and of hunters and fishermen to act without restraint all met his unqualified opposition." A trustee of the Association for the Protection of the Adirondacks, he led a floor fight in 1915, successfully protecting the Forever Wild clause of the New York State Constitution.

Marshall's interest in conservation extended to the national stage. In an intervention at the US Supreme Court, he had a key influence on a landmark case underscoring the right and responsibility of the Federal government for environmental protection and conservation. In a friend of the court brief on The State of Missouri v. Ray V. Holland, US Game Warden on behalf of the Association for the Protection of the Adirondacks, Marshall successfully persuaded the Court to uphold the Migratory Bird Treaty Act of 1918, between the US and Canada. As characterized by Adler, Marshall argued that "the United States did have the power to create such legislation; that Congress was well within its rights; and that the Act was constitutional"; and further that, "If Congress possessed plenary powers to legislate for the protection of the public domain, then it had to take into account all possibility for such protection", including protection of migratory birds, "these natural guardians" against "hostile insects, which, if not held in check ... would result in the inevitable destruction" of "both prairie and forest lands". According to Handlin, Marshall's intervention "was a major factor in the decision.". "It is not only a sin to kill a mockingbird, it is also a crime,’ Judge Valerie Caproni wrote in a forceful decision.".

In an address at the University of the State of New York at Albany on October 21, 1921, Marshall argued passionately that "the people of this State have for a century been guilty of criminal recklessness in the manner in which they have permitted their magnificent forests to be destroyed. The entire country is beginning to perceive a glimmer of the calamity that confronts it if a policy of forestation is not carried into execution speedily. Our water courses will dry up. Our most fertile agricultural lands will become arid. The wild life of the forest, the fishes that were once abundant in our streams are threatened with extermination unless there is a speedy remedy ..."

At a more personal level, Marshall took a keen interest in the natural environment. Marshall became a member of the Adirondack Mountain Club after its founding in 1922.

=== Political perspective ===
Alienated by what he perceived as the populism of the Democratic Party, and the "half-baked theories" of the Progressive Party, Marshall was a lifelong Republican, endorsing Republican candidates for election and working closely with Republican congressmen and state legislators. Although sympathetic with labor he was doubtful about the constitutionality of many laws passed on its behalf. He was suspicious of politicians like Theodore Roosevelt or Woodrow Wilson who choreographed their political campaigns to appeal emotionally to the masses; and he considered those in favor of a direct primary or a referendum "misguided", "demagogues" or "rogues". Additionally, Marshall was consistently opposed to any attempt to create a unified Jewish vote, claiming that while Jewish individuals could interface with politics, the community as a whole should not.

== Family life and legacy ==
As full as was his professional life, family played a central role in Marshall's life.

=== Raising a family ===
On May 6, 1895, he married Florence Lowenstein, a cousin of his partner, Samuel Untermyer. Lowenstein "was the daughter of Sophia Mendelson Lowenstein of New York and Benedict Lowenstein, a wealthy Bavarian immigrant ... She had been educated at The Normal College (now Hunter College) in New York". Within a few years, Louis and Florence Marshall had four children: James, Ruth, Robert (known as Bob), and George. They lived comfortably in a three-story brownstone house at Number 47 East 72nd Street in Manhattan, a block and a half from Central Park; the US Census of 1900 indicates that four servants resided with the Marshalls at this address. The children attended the Ethical Culture School across Central Park from their home. Adler relates that "... everything centered around the up-bringing of these children. He was a good pal to his boys, and used to play baseball with them, the sport which he most admired.".

=== Home away from home ===
In 1899, together with five other families, the Marshalls bought 500 acres (2.0 km^{2}) of shoreline on Lower Saranac Lake in the Adirondacks and hired architect William L. Coulter to design and build a "great camp" to be called Knollwood. Many summers were spent there. According to James Glover,

Since the Marshall family never owned a car, they would travel by rail ... to Saranac Lake Village. From there it was a mile and a half ride by rowboat across the lake, or a four-mile surrey ride around the lake. ... The walls were decorated with an assortment of moose antlers, prize fish mounted on plaques, and the heavily antlered head of an elk ... If the elk could have seen with its glass eyes, it ... never would have seen the water, for Louis Marshall would not allow any of the trees blocking the view to be cut.

Upon Florence Lowenstein Marshall's death of cancer on May 27, 1916, at age 43, daughter Ruth became surrogate mother for her younger siblings. Marshall found respite in nature:

There was scarcely a day, in New York, when he did not walk through Central Park; and he treasured the periods he could spend at Knollwood. The silence of the forest paths brought a "healing to the soul." Feasting his eyes upon the hemlocks and the birches, often he felt as if his lost wife were at his side, and that made of Knollwood "one of the sacred places of the earth."

=== In their father's footsteps ===
In adulthood, Marshall's children followed in his footsteps. The eldest, James, became a lawyer, joining his father's firm, later starting his own. James rose to prominence in New York City, where he served on and was president of the city's Board of Education under Mayor Fiorello La Guardia. James also co-founded the Natural Resources Defense Council and authored several books on psychology and the law. He married Lenore Guinzburg, who became noted for her writing as well as discovering and editing the work of author William Faulkner. Together, James and Lenore founded the New Hope Foundation "to foster world peace and understanding". Ruth married Jacob Billikopf, a Philadelphia labor arbitrator 16 years her senior; like her mother, Ruth died young of cancer, at age 38.

Drawing deeply from their childhood experiences in the Adirondacks, the younger boys, Bob and George, became noted conservationists. The sprawling Bob Marshall Wilderness, comprising over a million acres (4000 km^{2}) of pristine wilderness straddling the continental divide in northwestern Montana, is named after Bob, who was director of the Forestry Division of the federal Bureau of Indian Affairs, head of the U.S. Forest Service Division of Recreation and Lands, and co-founder of The Wilderness Society. George was involved with The Wilderness Society for more than 50 years, and served on the board of directors of the Sierra Club, as well.

James Marshall's son Jonathan Marshall owned and published the Scottsdale Daily Progress newspaper. Jonathan ran unsuccessfully for United States Senate against Barry Goldwater in 1974.

=== End of life ===
Louis Marshall died on September 11, 1929, at age 72, while attending a Zionist conference in Zurich, Switzerland. The occasion of his visit to Switzerland was perhaps deeply ironic, as Marshall had been a non-Zionist for most of his life. At the time of his death, he was president of the American Jewish Committee, and was attending the conference in that capacity. Marshall was in Zurich for the first gathering of the Extended Jewish Agency, an institution organized by him and Chaim Weizmann to enhance Zionist perspective and foster diaspora-Jewish identity.

True to the values and principles by which he led his life, in his last will and testament, he tithed ten percent of his personal net worth to the "Jewish Theological Seminary of America and to twelve other educational and charitable institutions".

The Syracuse Post-Standard's editorial, written upon Marshall's death in 1929, depicts his motivation as: "Always, it was justice. ... justice to all who were in need of justice. ... justice to the people who, like himself, were of Jewish origin. ... His was an intense Americanism. ... He was a man who helped humanity. ... unafraid, a man whose hand was ready to lift a load ... necessary for the lessening of misfortune or oppression, a worker in our common life who because he was a worker, became a leader, a man who crowded his years with service for the benefit of those about him- altogether an eminent American citizen whom a multitude will hold in grateful remembrance."

Marshall, his wife, daughter Ruth, and son Bob are buried in the Salem Fields Cemetery, in Brooklyn, New York.

== Honors ==
According to his son's biographer, in 1923 Louis Marshall was named the fourth "most outstanding Jew in the world" by a "Reader's poll by the Jewish Tribune ... None of the three men who topped him in the poll—Albert Einstein, Weizmann, and Israel Zangwill—were Americans". In 1927, on the occasion of Marshall's 70th birthday, the accolade "Champion of Liberty" was bestowed upon him by US Supreme Court Justice Benjamin Cardozo: "He is a great lawyer; a great champion of ordered liberty; a great leader of his people; a great lover of mankind." In his memorial essay on Marshall's life, Adler notes that Marshall "had received several honorary degrees: LL.D. from Syracuse University, and D.H.L. from the Hebrew Union College and from the Jewish Theological Seminary, and of these he was very appreciative."

The University of Pennsylvania's first Jewish student organization (that served as a dormitory, kosher dining room and a social center for the university's Jewish students), which was organized in 1924 and initially generically named the Jewish Students’ Association at Penn, after the death of Louis Marshall was renamed after him as the Louis Marshall Society (until January 1, 1944, when it merged with Hillel and took on the Hillel name).

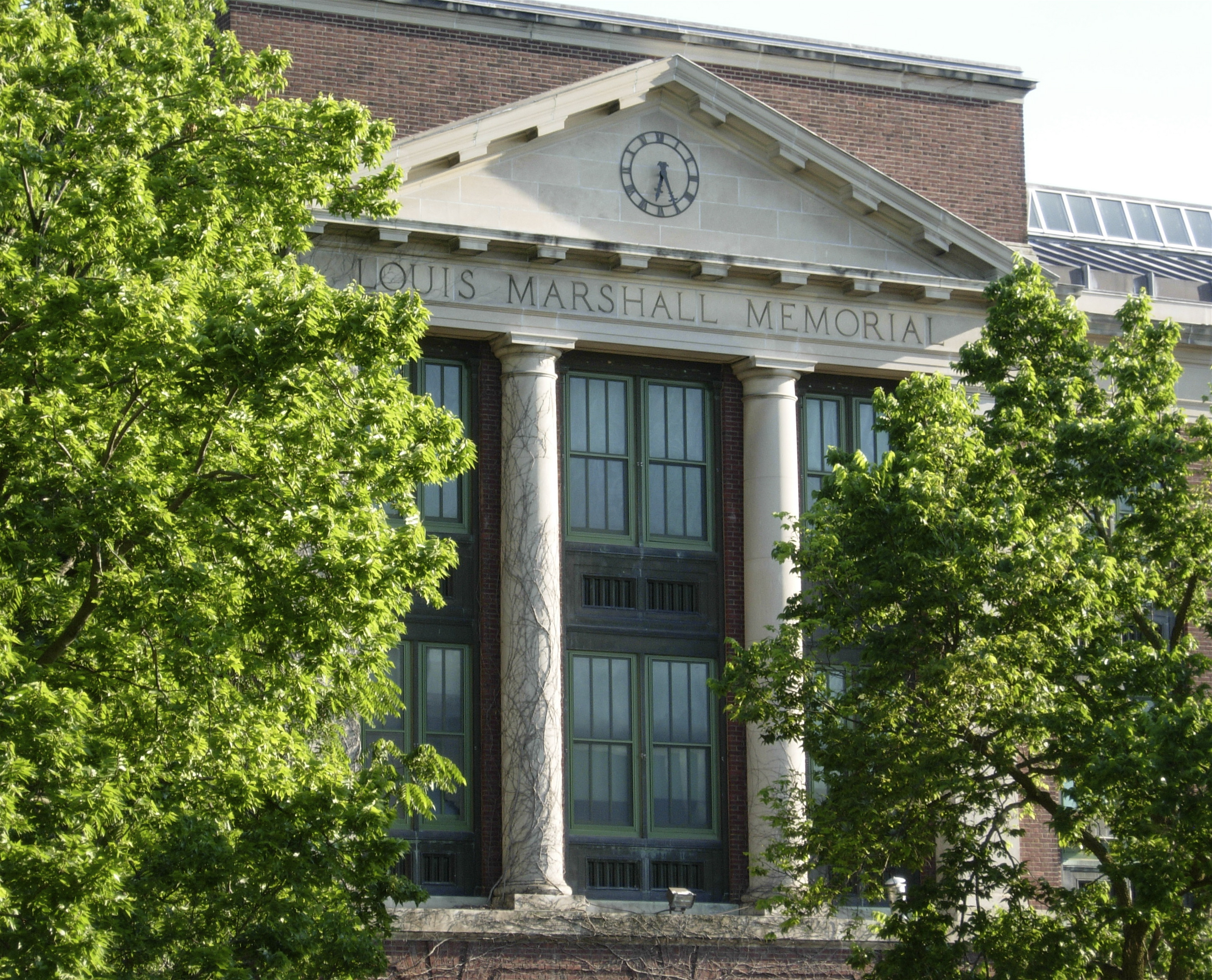
Louis Marshall Memorial Hall (Marshall Hall), on the campus of SUNY-ESF

According to Adler, in January 1930, as a tribute to Louis Marshall, New York Governor Franklin D. Roosevelt, "recommended an appropriation of $600,000 for a new building at Syracuse University to house the College of Forestry"; he recommended further that new building be named after Louis Marshall, "in memory of his splendid services to the State". Three years later, February 23, 1933, Louis Marshall Memorial Hall, the second building erected at the New York State College of Forestry, was dedicated in Marshall's honor. A full portrait of Louis Marshall hangs to this day in the college's Board Room, in Bray Hall.

On January 19, 2001, Marshall Hall was rededicated to Marshall and his son, Bob, by SUNY-ESF President Cornelius B. Murphy, Jr. According to Murphy, "Louis Marshall is largely the reason that everyone from the college is here today. Louis Marshall was recruited by Chancellor Day in 1910 to make the concept of the 'forestry college' at Syracuse University a reality. Louis was tenacious, prodding both the Governor and the Legislature to take action. Louis Marshall ... lobbied for the $250,000 appropriation to make a building a reality. I think that it is safe to say that Louis Marshall was our father, our first leader and our first forester. Today we rededicate this building to his memory and accomplishments." The rededication included unveiling matching bronze plaques honoring Marshall and his son, ESF alumnus, Bob Marshall.

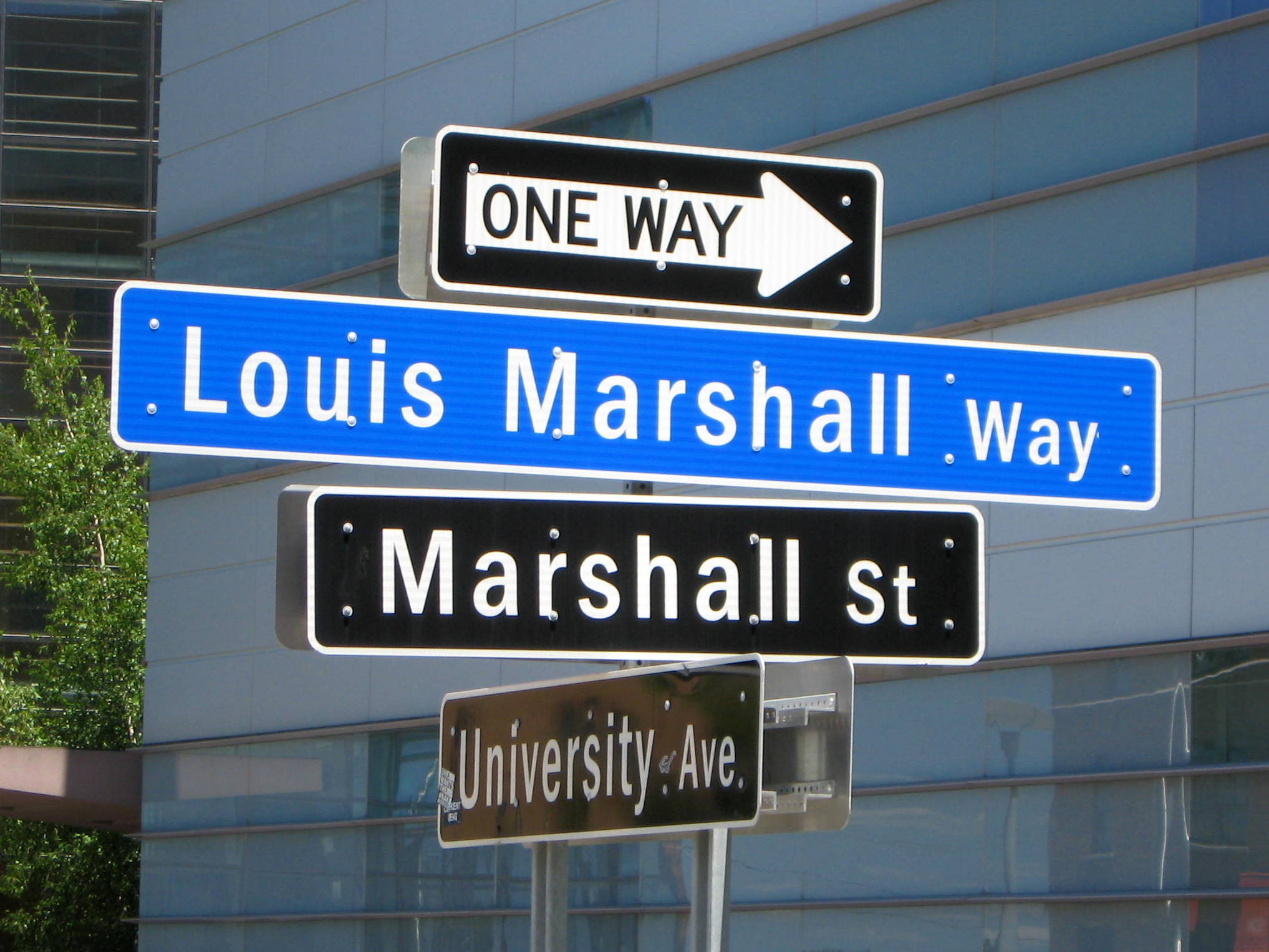
Marshall Street, Syracuse, New York

Marshall Street, the anchor street of the business district immediately adjacent to Syracuse University, is named in his honor. Just off of that street is the indoor mini-mall known as Marshall Square, also named after him, as is elementary school P.S. 276, in Brooklyn, New York.

There is a Louis Marshall Street in Tel Aviv

The Jewish Theological Seminary (JTS) hosts an annual, "Louis Marshall Award Dinner". The Louis Marshall Award is presented to individuals who demonstrate the exemplary ethics and philanthropic commitment embodied by Louis Marshall, an esteemed constitutional lawyer and former board chair of JTS. Founded in 1886 as a rabbinical school, the Jewish Theological Seminary today is the academic and spiritual center of Conservative Judaism worldwide, encompassing a world-class library and five schools.

== See also ==
- History of the Jews in the United States
- History of antisemitism in the United States
- Environmental history of the United States
- People v. the Brooklyn Cooperage Company
