= Journal of Forestry =

- Discipline: Forestry
- Language: English
- Edited by: Keith A. Blatner

Publication details
- History: 1902–present
- Publisher: Oxford University Press for Society of American Foresters (United States)
- Frequency: 6/year
- Impact factor: 2.675 (2018)

Standard abbreviations
- ISO 4: J. For.

Indexing
- CODEN: JFUSAI
- ISSN: 0022-1201

Links
- Journal homepage

The Journal of Forestry is the primary scholarly journal of the Society of American Foresters. It aims to advance the forestry profession by keeping professional foresters informed about developments and ideas related to the practice of forestry. The journal publishes editorials and technical content related to the management of forests and related natural resources. Articles are generally written for an audience of natural resources professionals, with topics spanning the many facets or disciplines of forestry. The Journal is currently edited by Keith A. Blatner. According to the Journal Citation Reports, its 2018 impact factor is 2.675.

== History ==
The origins of the Journal of Forestry go back to October 1902, when one of its predecessors, the Forestry Quarterly, was first published at the New York State College of Forestry at Cornell University, in Ithaca, New York, under the editorial advisement of Bernhard E. Fernow, John Gifford, and Walter Mulford. Less than a year later, upon closure of the College, the Quarterly commenced independent publication, with Bernhard E. Fernow as editor-in-chief and a board of editors consisting of many prominent figures in American forestry in the early part of the 20th century, including Carl A. Schenck, founder of the Biltmore Forest School and Andrew J. Foy of Southern Illinois University Carbondale.

The Journal of Forestry commenced publication in 1917, incorporating the Quarterly and the Proceedings of the Society of American Foresters. Volume was set at 15, continuing the Quarterly number system. Editorial responsibilities were assumed by the editorial board of the Society of American Foresters, for which the Journal became the official publication.

Since 2018, the Journal has been published by Oxford University Press. The archive of previous Proceedings and Journal volumes and issues is available from OUP's Journal website.

== Impact ==
In addition to impact rankings by Journal Impact Factor (JIF) Journal Citation Reports, Vanclay analyzed the ranking of 180 forestry journals by several additional metrics, including the h-index. He reported that for the period from 2000 to 2007, the Journal of Forestry ranked number 8 of 180 using the h-index.

== See also ==
- List of forestry journals
