= Ralph Hosmer =

Ralph S. Hosmer
- Ralph Hosmer
- Born: March 4, 1874; Deerfield, Massachusetts, United States
- Died: July 20, 1963 (aged 89)
- Education: Harvard University, Yale University
- Known for: First superintendent, Hawaii Division of Forestry; Professor and head, Department of Forestry at Cornell University
- Awards: Schlich Memorial Award, Society of American Foresters
- Scientific career
- Fields: Forestry
- Workplaces: Cornell University, U.S. Forest Service

Ralph Sheldon Hosmer (March 4, 1874 - July 20, 1963) was Hawaii's first territorial forester, a contemporary of Gifford Pinchot who was among the group of educated American foresters that organized what is now the United States Forest Service. Hosmer later joined the faculty of Cornell University as head of the department of Forestry, where he served for 28 years until his retirement.

== Early life ==
Hosmer was born in Deerfield, Massachusetts to father George Herbert Hosmer, a Unitarian minister, and mother Julia West Sheldon Hosmer. An only child, he was stricken by pleuropneumonia at age 15, and to aid his recovery, was ordered by his physician to spend his time out of doors walking and being active. For several years following his illness his activities included frequent visits to the Arnold Arboretum, where he gained the acquaintance of professor F. H. Storer, agricultural chemist and Dean of Harvard's Bussey Institution who influenced Hosmer's development.

== Education ==
Hosmer attended the Bussey Institution and the Lawrence Scientific School of Harvard University from Fall 1891 to June 1895, graduating with a bachelor's degree in Agricultural Science. Later, in 1901–1902, he earned a master's degree in forestry from the Yale University School of Forestry.

== Work ==
From May 1896 to November 1898 Hosmer worked in the Division of Soils of the U.S. Department of Agriculture. He was transferred by request of Gifford Pinchot to the Division of Forestry (later the Bureau of Forestry, then the Forest Service) as a Field Assistant. After completing his degree at Yale in 1902, Hosmer returned to Washington and was promoted the following year to Chief of the Section of Forest Replacement in the Bureau of Forestry. He worked all over the country, in the New York Adirondacks to Maine to California. His experience in California introduced him to eucalyptus trees and the role of mountain forests in supplying water for agricultural irrigation. Both became prominent components of his later work in Hawaii.

In 1904, Hosmer became the first territorial forester for the newly established Division of Forestry in Hawaii. His work included efforts to preserve, protect and expand the forests of Hawaii through the establishment of large forest reserves, protection from trespass, grazing and fires, planting of exotics, and conservation education. His efforts led to the establishment of some 800,000 acres (320,000 ha) of forest reserves on Hawaii by 1914. His contributions are memorialized at the Ralph S. Hosmer Grove in Haleakala National Park, which is now the site of a campground and picnic area. 20.7666°N 156.237°W.

In 1914, Hosmer replaced Walter Mulford as Professor and head of the Department of Forestry at the New York State College of Agriculture at Cornell University, a position he held until his retirement in June 1942.

== Hosmer's Grove ==
Plants and animals that were brought to Hawaii by people are called "alien". The trees of Hosmer's Grove include pine, spruce, cedar and eucalyptus imported from all over the world. They were planted around 1910 by Ralph Hosmer as part of a forestry experiment. Most of the grasses seen in this area are also aliens that became established when cattle were grazed here.

Hosmer's plan for timber farming in Hawaii never worked out. Only 20 of the 86 species introduced there survived. Of these, some with shallow roots are blown down in storms. Some found the soil chemistry or fungi unsuitable for growth or reproduction. But others have thrived. Some trees have escaped from Hosmer's experimental forest. The Mexican Weeping pine, Monterey pine, and eucalyptus are aggressively seeding and must be constantly tended to prevent them from overrunning the natives.

== Personal and later life ==
He was married on December 30, 1913, to Jessi Nash Irwin in Massachusetts. They had one son, two daughters, five grandsons and one granddaughter.
