= William F. Fox =

Colonel William F. Fox (11 January 1840 – 16 June 1909) was the Superintendent of Forests at the Adirondack Park in New York State.

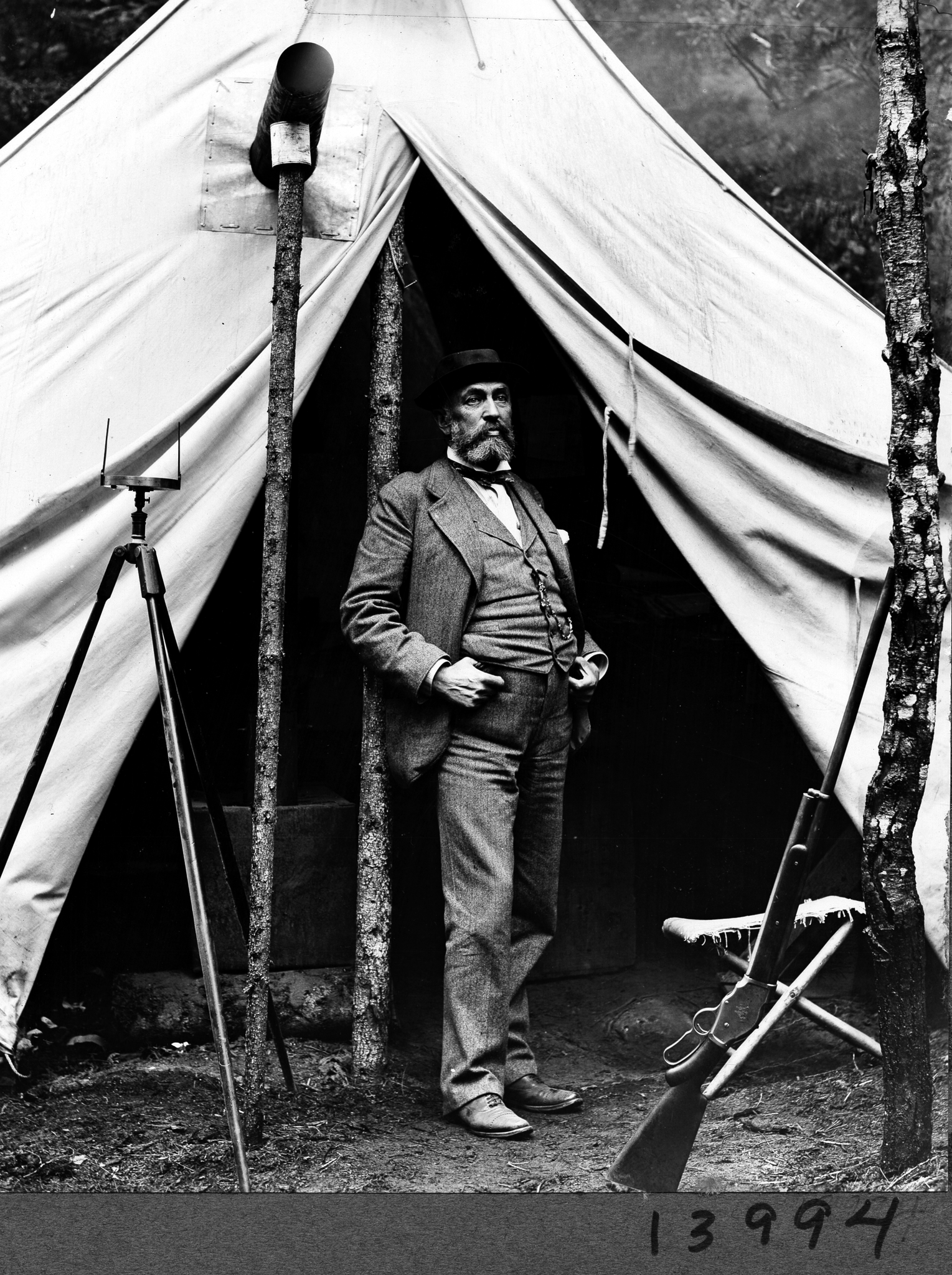

Fox was born in Ballston Spa, New York on January 11, 1840. He graduated from the Engineering Department of Union College in 1860. He fought in the American Civil War as Captain, Major, and Lieutenant Colonel of the 107th New York Volunteers and wrote extensively about his war experiences. His "Chances of Being Hit in Battle" was published by Century Magazine in 1888, In 1889, he published the book Regimental Losses in the American Civil War. He then wrote New York at Gettysburg (three volumes), Slocum and His Men and a biography of General Green.

Fox's family was in the lumber business. He visited Germany to study scientific forestry methods there. From 1875 to 1882, he was a private forester for the Blossburg Coal, Mining and Railroad Company in Bossburg, PA. He became a New York State employee in 1885, as assistant secretary to the Forest Commission. He was an Assistant Forest Warden from 1888 to 1891, and became the first Superintendent of Forests upon the creation of the Adirondack Park.

His reports as Superintendent of Forests were instrumental in the founding of the New York State College of Forestry at Cornell.

On June 14, 2019 the New York State Tree Nursery in Saratoga Springs was renamed in honor of Colonel William F. Fox.
