= Knollwood Club =

Building in New York, United States

Coordinates: 44°19′08″N 74°11′13″W

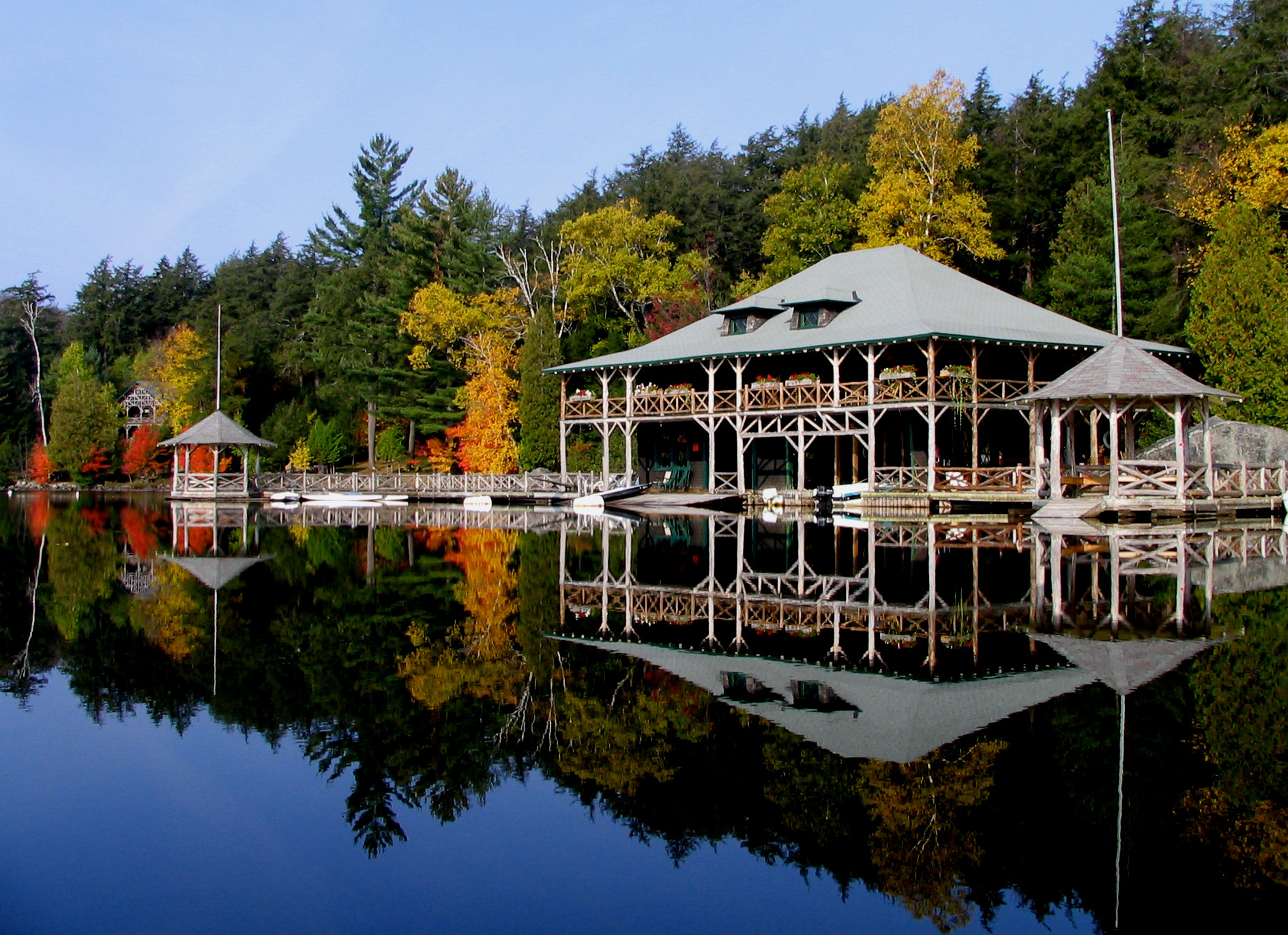
The boathouse at Knollwood. The front of one of the cottages can be seen on the extreme left.

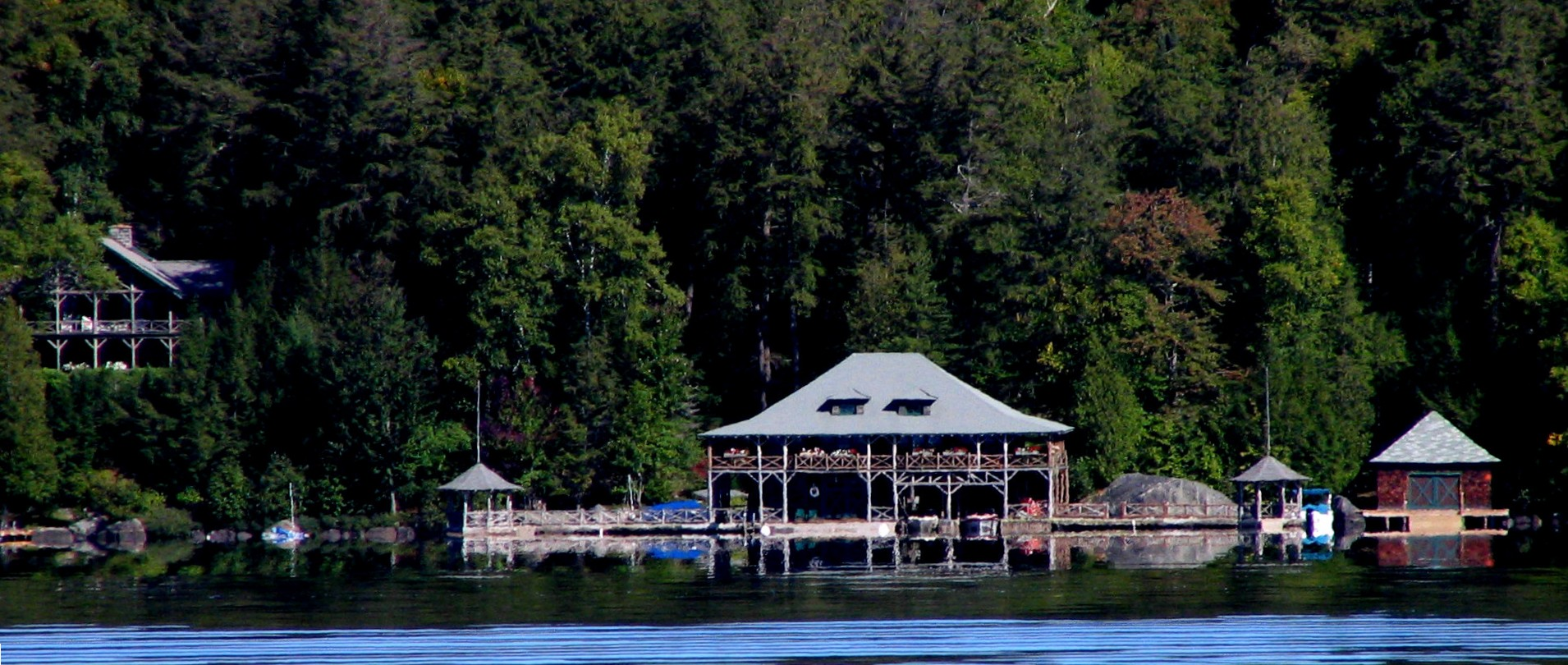
View from Shingle Bay. One of the six cottages is visible at left.

Knollwood Club is an Adirondack Great Camp on Shingle Bay, Lower Saranac Lake, near the village of Saranac Lake, New York, United States. It was built in 1899–1900 by William L. Coulter, who had previously created a major addition to Alfred G. Vanderbilt's Sagamore Camp. The "club" consisted of a boathouse, "casino", and six identical 2 1/2-story shingle cottages, which were distinguished by unique twig work facades.

The camp was built for six friends: Elias Asiel (Asiel & Co.), George Blumenthal (Lazard Freres), Max Nathan, Abram M. Stein, Daniel Guggenheim (American Smelting and Refining), and lawyer Louis Marshall. The choice of Lower Saranac Lake as the site was determined in part by the growing antisemitism in America in that period. In 1877, Joseph Seligman was involved in the most publicized antisemitic incident in American history up to that point, being denied entry into the Grand Union Hotel in Saratoga Springs, New York, despite having been a regular guest previously. William West Durant owned much of the land bordering the Saranac Lakes, and was more than willing to sell to any and all buyers. As a result, many of the Great Camps and cottages on the Saranac Lakes were built by wealthy Jewish people.

Bob Marshall, the wilderness activist, and brothers George Marshall, the conservationist, James Marshall (author and co-founder of the Natural Resources Defense Council) and their sister Ruth Marshall Billikopf spent the summers of their youth there, and were greatly influenced by the surroundings.

Albert Einstein was a frequent summer visitor; he was at Knollwood on August 6, 1945, when he heard on the radio that the atom bomb had been dropped on Hiroshima, and it was at Knollwood that he gave his first interview after the event, on August 11.

== Sources ==
- Kaiser, Harvey. Great Camps of the Adirondacks. Boston: David R. Godine, 1982. ISBN 0-87923-308-7.
