= Clarence Petty =

Clarence Adelbert Petty (August 8, 1905 – November 30, 2009) was an American forest ranger, conservationist, and outdoorsman. A Supervising Forest Ranger in the Adirondack Forest Preserve, Petty is best known for his advocacy supporting protection of the Adirondack Park.

Petty graduated from Saranac Lake High School in 1925, struggling with mathematics. In the same year, he matriculated into the forestry program at the New York State College of Forestry at Syracuse University.

Again struggling in college, he was given a job to teach the use of a transit theodolite and survey equipment, despite the fact that he initially barely understood these instruments himself. Teaching others helped Petty develop both a better understanding of surveying and a better appreciation for social interactions. He graduated in June 1930.

One of his enduring legacies is the classification of land in the Park as either forest or wilderness; this classification determines permitted uses. In wilderness areas, motor vehicle access is very limited; snowmobiles, all-terrain vehicles, seaplanes, and motorboats are prohibited. The classification resulted in large part from his study of more than 1,300 miles (2,100 km) of rivers and streams, a project he undertook by canoe and portage in the early 1970s, when he was in his sixties.

Petty worked for the Civilian Conservation Corps during the Great Depression and served in the Navy as a pilot in the Pacific during World War II. He remained an active flight instructor at the airport in Potsdam, New York until the age of 94, and maintained an active pilot's license until the age of 96.

He bequeathed his homes in Canton, New York and Coreys, New York, (a hamlet in Franklin County) to the Nature Conservancy after his son Ed's lifetime tenancy.

== Accolades ==
In tribute, Adirondack Explorer magazine's Dick Beamish wrote an obituary for Petty. He wrote that "In reference to [the] view (mentioned in the New York Times obituary) that Clarence was 'repressive and arrogant'... Nothing could be further from the truth." which brought forth many letters from readers. Portions of resulting submissions follow.

- "Clarence was a man's man and a gentleman's gentleman. He spoke out calmly and passionately for the Adirondack Park. He listened to the opinions of others and refrained from attacking their views. Even those who disagreed with him found him a man to respect."
- "A 'Clarence Petty Great Wilderness' (of some 400,000 acres (1,600 km^{2}) near Cranberry Lake) rings a sweet bell. That would be a deserving capstone for his dedication, perseverance, and lifelong contributions."
- "Ever since I subscribed to the 'Adirondack Explorer', the first segment I would look for would be 'Questions for Clarence.'"
- "I regret never having met him and being able to thank him for the single-handed efforts that ensured that one of the most beautiful and intriguing places on this Earth would remain that way forever."
- "I've enclosed a check in his memory to use as you see fit to promote his causes. A foundation should be formed in his name. Let this be the start." Ballston Spa
