= Walter Mulford =

American forester and academic 1877–1955)

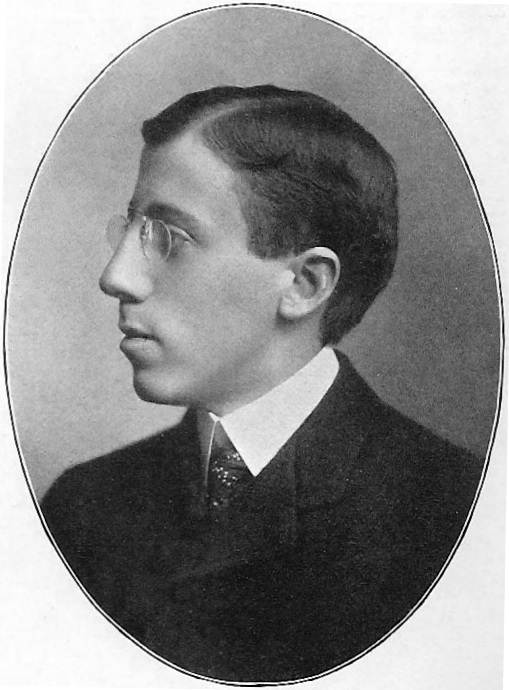

Walter Mulford (September 16, 1877 – September 7, 1955) was an American forester for the state of Connecticut, and a professor. He was the first state forester in the United States.

== Biography ==
He was born on September 16, 1877, in Millville, New Jersey.

He was professor at the University of Michigan (1905–1911), and Cornell University (1911–1914), the latter at which he helped re-establish and lead a department of forestry. In 1914 he came to the University of California, Berkeley, where he served until his retirement in 1947, filling successively the roles of chief of Division of Forestry, chairman of the Department of Forestry, and first dean of the School of Forestry. He served as president of the Society of American Foresters in 1924, of which he was elected fellow in 1939. The University of Michigan bestowed on him an honorary Doctor of Science degree in 1938.

He died on September 7, 1955, at a sanitarium in St. Helena, California at the age of 78.

== Legacy ==
Mulford Hall, constructed for the UC Berkeley School of Forestry (now part of the College of Natural Resources), is named for him.
