= Frederick Olmsted Jr. =

American artist and biophysicist

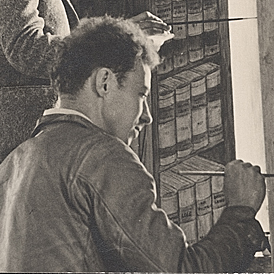
- Olmsted, 1934.
- Born: April 10, 1911; San Francisco, California, U.S.
- Died: February 14, 1990 (aged 78); Falmouth, Massachusetts, U.S
- Other names: Fred Olmsted, Ric Olmsted
- Education: Stanford University, California School of Fine Arts; Yale University
- Occupations: Artist, biophysicist
- Employer(s): Works Progress Administration Federal Art Projects; Public Works of Art Project; Cleveland Clinic Woods Hole Oceanographic Institution
- Known for: muralist, work in developing pacemaker
- Father: Frederick E. Olmsted

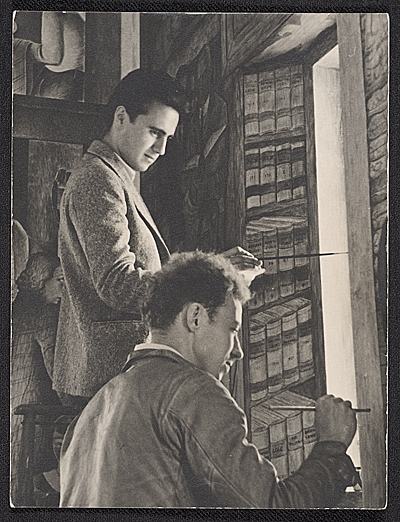
George Albert Harris and Olmsted (front) working on Coit Tower mural, 1934. Photo by Peter Stackpole

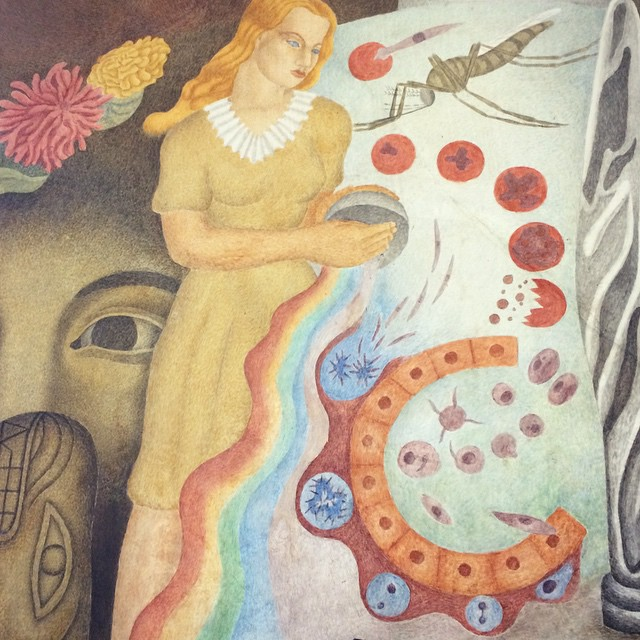
Detail of "Theory and Science", City College of San Francisco

Frederick "Fred" Olmsted Jr. (April 10, 1911 – February 14, 1990) was an American artist and biophysicist. He created social realism themed murals and sculptures for the Federal Art Project, and the Public Works of Art Project.

Later, he became a scientist and biophysicist at Yale University, the Cleveland Clinic, and Woods Hole Oceanographic Institution.

== Early life ==
Olmsted was born in San Francisco, California on April 10, 1911. He was the son of Florence Starbuck du Bois and Frederick E. Olmsted, a United States Forest Service administrator and one of the founders of American forestry. He was a great-nephew of the landscape architect Frederick Law Olmsted. When he was young, his family lived on the campus of Stanford University.

As a child, Olmsted's family lived in a house on the campus of Stanford University. They also spent summers in New Hampshire. His father died in 1925.

Olmsted studied science at Stanford University. He graduated with a degree in English in April 1933. He was studied art under of Ralph Stackpole at the California School of Fine Arts (now the San Francisco Art Institute). In June 1935, he received an Award of Merit in sculpture in the school's annual student exhibit.

== Career ==
=== Art ===
During the Great Depression, Olmsted worked for the Works Progress Administration, assisting John Langley Howard and George Albert Harris in their Coit Tower murals in San Francisco. Although he was an undergraduate student assistant, Olmsted was allowed to create his a three-foot by three-foot fresco mural called "Power" for the Public Works of Art Project. The mural is located above the main entrance on the outer north wall of Coit Tower. It features a fist "to give rise to the proletariat."

Olmsted also assisted Diego Rivera with his 1931 mural "The Making of a Mural Showing the Building of a City" at the San Francisco Art Institute (SFAI). Olmsted also painted a window archway called "Pottery" in the Anne Bremer Memorial Library at the SFAI.

In 1935 while still an art student, he painted a fresco mural at the SFAI named "Marble Workers" which depicted tradesmen at work at a Fisherman's Wharf tile shop. At some point, the Works Progress Administration-funded mural was painted over. In 2013, the "Marble Workers" was rediscovered and a Save America's Treasures grant was awarded to offset the cost of its restoration in September 2019.

In 1935, Olmsted's work was included in the San Francisco Museum of Art Inaugural exhibition. The same year, he also was included at a show at the California School of Fine Arts, winning the award.

For the 1939–1940 Golden Gate International Exposition on Treasure Island, Olmsted displayed two engravings and also created two sculptures representing Leonardo da Vinci and Thomas Edison that stand .7 feet (2.1 m) high by 4 feet (1.2 m) square and consist of nine tons of stone. He carved the stone sculptures during the WPA's Art in Action, an exhibition of artists working live for audiences in the summer of 1940. Millions of visitors to the expedition saw Olmsted working on the sculptures. When the Golden Gate International Exposition was over, the sculptures were donated to City College of San Francisco (CCSF) and are currently on display at the CCSF Ocean Campus.

In March 1941, Olmsted received a $900 ($19,700 in today's money) Phelan Art Fellowship for sculpture from the James D. Phalen Awards in Literature and Art Committee. He worked on his sculptures at the Junior College of San Francisco (now City College of San Francisco). He served on the committee that organized the first annual open air art show in San Francisco in 1941.

In 1941, Olmsted painted two 12 by 8 feet (3.7 by 2.4 m) foot tempera fresco murals at the City College of San Francisco for the Federal Arts Project (FAP) of the Works Progress Administration. Called "Theory and Science 2" and "Theory and Science 3", the murals are in the lobby of the Science Building over the west entrance stairs. The murals show male and female students engaged in scientific activities such as conducting field research, excavating a dinosaur fossil, and looking at bacteria through a microscope. Olmsted created the murals using small brush strokes and a muted, earth-toned color palette.

In June 1942, Olmsted was included in a ten-artist exhibition at the San Francisco Museum of Art. In December 1942, he was featured in another exhibit at the museum that included the curator's favorites works from the permanent collection. Olmsted taught art for a few years at California College of Arts and Crafts in Oakland (now called California College of Art).

=== Biophysics ===
In the early 1940s, Olmsted abandoned his art career and became a scientist at Yale University. In the 1950s and 1960s, he worked in the division of research at the Cleveland Clinic with Irvine Page, designing and testing various medical devices. He developed a machine to shock the diseased hearts of dogs, a prototype for today's pacemaker. Next, Olmsted worked in the biology department of the Woods Hole Oceanographic Institution where he also designed equipment.

== Personal life ==
While at the California School of Fine Arts Olmsted met fellow student Barbara Leslie Greene who was a native of Williams, Arizona. They married in Reno, Nevada on December 8, 1933. They had a daughter in July 1939 and later divorced.

In 1990, Olmsted died in Falmouth, Massachusetts at the age of 78.

== Selected publications ==
- Frederick Olmsted and A.C. Corcoran. "Systolic Pressure in the Intact, Unanesthetized Rat." Federal Proceedings, vol. 7, pt. 1 (March 1948): 88.
- Frederick Olmsted, A.C. Corcoran, and Irvine H. Page. "Blood Pressure in the Unanesthetized Rat. I" Circulation, vol. 3, no. 3 (May 1, 1951): 722–726.
- Frederick Olmsted, A.C. Corcoran, and Irvine H. Page. "Blood Pressure in the Unanesthetized Rat. II. Spontaneous Variations and Effect of Heat." Circulation, vol. 3, no. 5 (May 1, 1951): 727–729. DOI: 10.1161/01.cir.3.5.727
- Irvine H. Page and Frederick Olmsted. "The Influence of Respiratory Gas Mixtures on Arterial Pressure and Vascular Reactivity in 'Normal' and Hypertensive Dogs." Circulation, vol. 3 (June 1, 1951): 801–819.
- Frederick Olmsted, Irvine H. Page, and A.C. Corcoran. "A Device for Objective Clinical Measurement of Cutaneous Elasticity: a 'Pinchmeter'." The American Journal of the Medical Sciences, vol. 222, no. 1 (July 1951): 73–75. doi: 10.1097/00000441-195107000-00014.
- Frederick Olmsted. "Recording of Indirect Blood Pressure in the Unanesthetized Rat." Methods in Medical Research, vo. 5 (1952): 253–257.
- H H Fertig, Frederick Olmsted, and A.C. Corcoran. "The Fusion Frequency of Flicker in Hypertension; A Study of its Application the Estimation of Hypertensive Cardiovascular Disease." American Heart Journal, vol 44, no. 2 (August 1952): 261–267. doi: 10.1016/0002-8703(52)90151-8.
- F. Del Greco, Frederick Olmsted, G. M. Masson, and A.C. Corcoran. "Graphic Measurement of Arterial Pressure in the Unanesthetized Rat; an Improved Method." Journal of Laboratory and Clinical Medicine, vol. 41, no. 5 (May 1953): 729–37.
- L. A. Lewis, Frederick Olmsted, Irvine H. Page et al. "Serum Lipid Levels in Normal Persons; Findings of a Cooperative Study of Lipoproteins and Atherosclerosis." Circulation, vol. 16, no. 2 (August 1957): 227–245. DOI: 10.1161/01.cir.16.2.227
- Frederick Olmsted, Willem J. Kolff, and Donald B. Effler. "Electronic Cardiac Pacemaker After Open-Heart Operations: Report of a Case of Tetralogy of Fallot with Atrioventricular Block That Reverted to Sinus Rhythm." .Cleveland Clinic Journal of Medicine, .vol. 25, no. 2 (April 1958): 84–91.
- Frederick Olmsted, Willem J. Kolffan, and Donald B. Effler. "Three Safety Devices for the Heart-Lung Machine." Cleveland Clinic Journal of Medicine, vol. 25, no. 3 (July 1958): 169–176.
- Frederick Olmsted. "Measurement of Cardiac Output in Unrestrained Dogs by an Implanted Electromagnetic Meter." IRE Transactions on Medical Electronics vol: ME-6, no. 4 (December 1959): 210–213. DOI: 10.1109/IRET-ME.1959.5007967
- Frederick Olmsted and Franklin D. Aldrich. "Improved Electromagnetic Flowmeter; Phase Detection, A New Principle." .Journal of Applied Physiology, vol. 16, no. 1 (January 1961): 197–201.
- .Irvine H. Page and Frederick Olmsted. "Hemodynamic Effects of Angiotensin, Norepinephrine, and Bradykinin Continuously Measured in Unanesthetized Dogs." American Journal of Physiology, vol. 201, no. 1 (July 1961): 92–96.
- Frederick Olmsted. "New Techniques for Continuous Recording of Cardiovascular Functions in Urestrained Dogs." Journal of Applied Physiology, vol. 17, no. 1 (January 1, 1962): 152–156.
- Frederick Olmsted. "Biophysics in Cardiovascular Dynamics." Cleveland Clinic Journal of Medicine, vol. 29, no. 2 (April 1962): 90–95.
- Frederick Olmsted. "Phase Detection Electromagnetic Flowmeter-Design and Use." IRE Transactions on Bio-Medical Electronics, vol. 9, no. 2 (April 1962): 88–92. DOI 10.1109/TBMEL.1962.4322969.
- Frederick Olmsted and Irvine H. Page. "Hemodynamic Effects of Eledoisin, Kallidin II, and Bradykinin in Unanesthetized Dogs." American Journal of Physiology, vol. 203, no. 5 (November 1962): 951–954.
- Irvine H. Page and Frederick Olmsted. "Hemodynamic Mechanisms of Increased Cardiovascular Response Resulting from Ganglioplegics and Atropine." American Journal of Physiology, vol. 204, no. 4 (April 1963): 582–590.
- Frederick Olmsted and Irvine H. Page. "Hemodynamic Changes in Trained Dogs During Experimental Renal Hypertension." Circulation Research, vol. 16, no. 2 (February 1965): 134–139.
- Frederick Olmsted and Irvine H. Page."Hemodynamic Aspects of Prolonged Infusion of Angiotensin into Unanesthetized Dogs." Circulation Research, vol. 16, no. 2 (February 1965): 140–149.
- J. W. McCubbin, R. S. De Moura, Irvine H. Page, and Frederick Olmsted. "Arterial Hypertension Elicited by Subpressor Amounts of Angiotensin." Science, vol 149, no. 3690 (September 17, 1965): 1394–1395. doi: 10.1126/science.149.3690.1394.
- Frederick Olmsted and Irvine H. Page. "Hemodynamic Changes in Dogs Caused by Sodium Pentobarbital Anesthesia." American Journal of Physiology, vol. 210, no. 4 (April 1966): 817–820. doi: 10.1152/ajplegacy.1966.210.4.817
- Frederick Olmsted, J. W. McCubbin, and Irvine H. Page. "Hemodynamic Cause of the Pressor Response to Carotid Occlusion." American Journal of Physiology, vol. 210, no. 6 (June 1966): 1342–1346. DOI: 10.1152/ajplegacy.1966.210.6.1342

== External sources ==
- City College of San Francisco: Olmsted murals
- San Francisco City College: Olmsted sculptures
- Edison and DaVinci by Olmsted (Public Art and Architecture from Around the World)
- Frederick Olmsted at CCSF (Public Art and Architecture from Around the World)
- City College Heads: Science and Inspiration (Sunnyside History Project)
