= Frederick Olmsted =

Frederick Law Olmsted (1822–1903), American landscape architect and public administrator.

Frederick Olmsted may also refer to:

- Frederick Law Olmsted Jr. (1870–1957), his son, American landscape architect and city planner
- Frederick E. Olmsted (1872–1925), American forester
- Frederick Olmsted Jr. (1911–1990), American artist and biophysicist

== See also ==
- Fred Olmstead (1881–1936), American baseball player
