= NUBC =

NUBC May refer to:

- National Uniform Billing Committee
- Newcastle University Boat Club
- Nottingham University Boat Club
