= Carl A. Schenck =

German forester and educator (1868–1955)

- Carl Alwin Schenck, circa. 1910
- Born: Carl Alwin Schenck; March 25, 1868; Darmstadt, Grand Duchy of Hesse
- Died: May 17, 1955 (aged 87); Lindenfels, West Germany
- Education: University of Giessen; University of Tübingen; Technische Universität Darmstadt
- Known for: Forester, Biltmore Estate; Founder, Biltmore Forest School
- Scientific career
- Fields: Forestry
- Workplaces: Biltmore Estate; Biltmore Forest School; University of Giessen; University of Montana
- Notable students: Frederick E. Olmsted
- Author abbrev. (botany): C .A. Schenck

Carl Alwin Schenck (March 25, 1868 – May 17, 1955) was a German forester and pioneering forestry educator. When Schenck came to the United States to work for George W. Vanderbilt at the Biltmore Estate, he became the third formally trained forester in the United States. He established and operated the Biltmore Forest School, the first forestry school in North America, on Vanderbilt's property.

Schenck also helped create the forestry school at Sewanee: The University of the South, taught at the University of Montana in Missoula and the University of Giessen, and wrote textbooks. His teachings comprise the foundation of forestry education in the United States. However, Schenck's contributions were rarely recognized in histories of forestry because he was a German during an era when the United States fought two wars against Germany. The New York Times described him as "the most influential person in making forestry in this country a science and a profession."

== Early life ==
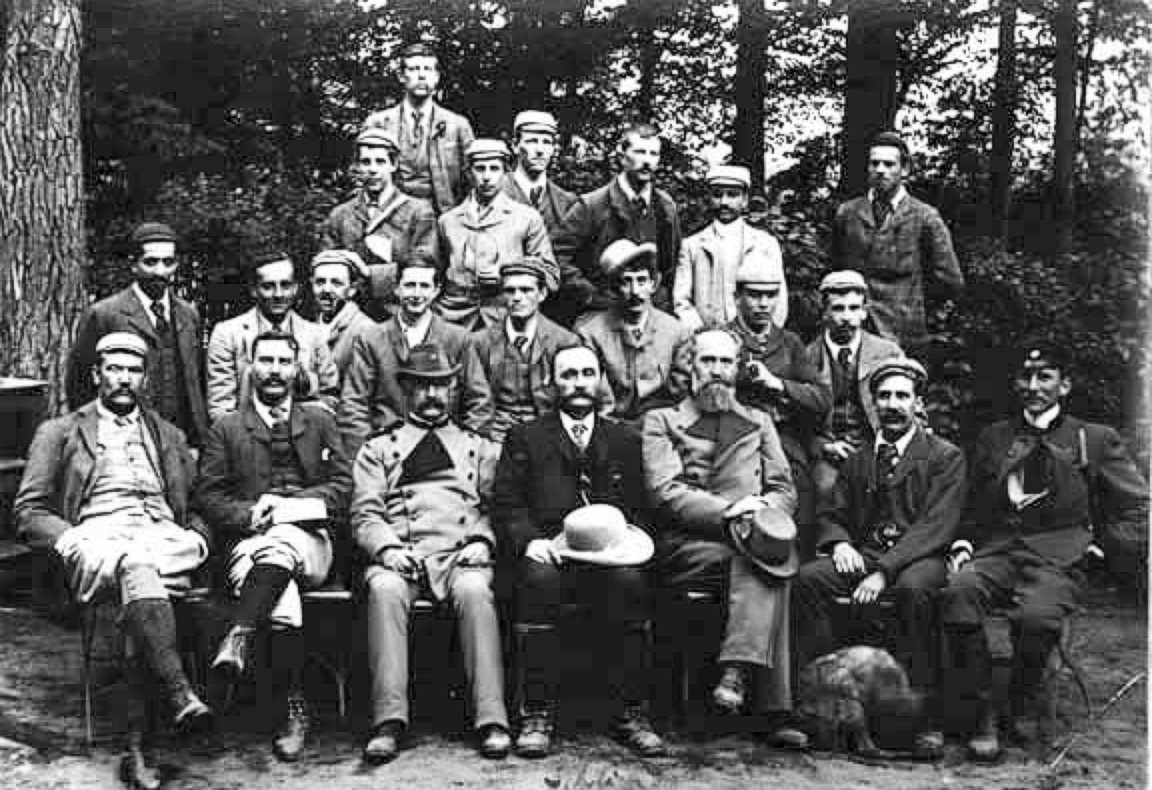
Schenck (far right) with William Schlich (middle, front row) and other students, Saxony, 1892

Schenck was born on March 25, 1868, in Darmstadt, now the state of Hesse, Germany. He was the son of Olga Cornelia Alewyn and Carl Jacob Schenck. The Schenck family became wealthy as goldsmiths in Darmstadt in the 17th century, rising to prominence and filling many local government positions. His grandfather was a chief forester in Hesse.

Schenck attended the Institute of Technology in Darmstadt, graduating when he was eighteen years old in 1886. He studied botany in Darmstadt before enrolling in college. He then attended the University of Tübingen School of Forestry. However, Schenck had to withdraw from the school because of a severe lung infection.

After recovering from his illness, Schenck enrolled in the forest school of the University of Giessen in 1888. There, he studied under visiting professor Dietrich Brandis, who was considered as the world's leading forester at the time. In 1890, Schenck became a forest assessor for the state forest service in Hessen; such service was required as part of his degree. In the summers between 1891 and 1894, he worked as an assistant and as a secretary to foresters Brandis and Wilhelm Philipp Daniel Schlich.

Schenck completed his Ph.D. degree in early 1895, summa cum laude. At Giessen, he also passed law examinations.

== Career ==
=== Biltmore Estate ===
After he received his Ph.D., Schenck was recommended by Brandis for a job in the United States working for George W. Vanderbilt in North Carolina. Schenck accepted the position and sailed to America, arriving in New York City on April 5, 1895. He became the third formally trained forester in the United States.

George W. Vanderbilt's Biltmore Estate near Asheville, North Carolina, included some 120,000 acres (49,000 ha) of mountain land. Based on the recommendation of landscape architect Frederick Law Olmsted, Vanderbilt had decided during the early 1890s that he wanted his forests managed using the best scientific principles of forestry. Vanderbilt first hired Gifford Pinchot as the estate's forester.

When Schenck arrived at Biltmore, he worked under Pinchot while the latter was transitioning to work for the U.S. Division of Forestry. However, his work crews and the sawmill would only take instruction from Pinchot and ignored Schenck because he was a foreigner. Schenck was frustrated, especially because Vanderbilt had said he would be in charge of the daily operations. Letters written between Pinchot and Schenck show his increasing frustration and the growing hostility between the two men.

In September 1895, Pinchot returned to North Carolina and granted Schenck the independence he needed to truly be Biltmore Estate's forester, provided he first completed Pinchot's pending projects. Schenck's first project was in the virgin growth Big Creek area where water was used to transport felled trees because there were few roads. As a result, the work crew overharvested tulip poplar trees that floated, leaving many other varieties of trees behind. The work crew also built a temporary splash dam, smoothing Big Creek to create a sluice that ruined the creek for fishing. However, the water strategy used at this location was Pinchot's, not Schenck's, and the latter had no prior experience with dams. When rains came, the logs moved downstream but caused significant damage to other properties, crops, and bridges.

As a result of this experience, Schenck determined that his methods were better and that American forestry—and Pinchot—was wasteful. He wrote, "As Americans are of the opinion that forestry and tree-planting are the same, I wish to say, that no reasonable forester would plant, where nature regenerates, and where woodlands can be bought at a price per acre, at which planting per acre cannot be done. I repeat, so absurd as it might sound, the disbursements for, operations should not be charged to Biltmore Forest, but to 'Sport and Landscape.'" Schenck admitted that he was so disappointed with the program at Biltmore that he nearly resigned from his position. Pinchot blamed Schenck for not letting go of "his German ways."

However, Schenck renewed his contract with Vanderbilt for the next year. By the middle of 1896, he had instituted his distinct version of German forestry, adapted for a forest in North Carolina. He wanted to make Biltmore a sustainable operation. Therefore, he looked for "projects that preserved some of the woods and allowed for natural regeneration as well as plantings." He returned exhausted farms into productive forests, set up firebreaks, established road systems, and created logging and lumbering operations. He also pushed the North Carolina legislature for laws that benefited forestry. Schenck then signed a ten-year contract with Vanderbilt which also provided insurance.

Between 1901 and 1903, Vanderbilt's financial situation changed. In 1903, Vanderbilt cut Schenck's departmental budget by some fifty percent and told him to borrow the rest from local banks. During 1903 and 1904, Schenck tried to earn a profit for the estate, including forgoing his usual two-month vacation in Germany. Although he did not earn enough to bail out Biltmore, Schenck impressed Vanderbilt with his commitment to forestry conservation and a profitable operation. In 1905 and 1906, when the financial situation looked better, Schenck borrowed from banks, trying to show that his forestry operation could support itself without patronage. This strategy was working; however, 1907 brought a financial crisis to the United States.

In March 1908, Schenck wrote Vanderbilt that the lumber business had declined and customers were slow to pay their bills; he needed more operational money to pay his workers, but was reluctant to take out another loan. Schenck also understood that Vanderbilt could not increase the budget for his forestry operations. Vanderbilt suggested selling some of his Pisgah Forest lands. This property included part of Schenck's long-term "masterpiece", the Biltmore Forest School, which he had always said needed time to see a profit. The relationship between Vanderbilt and Schenck fell apart as the two men quarreled over the property. Schenck wrote, “I did not make the slightest attempt to find a purchaser for Pisgah Forest. With that sale of Pisgah Forest, my beloved Biltmore Forest School would lose its working field, its demonstration field, its experiment stations, and its very basis.”

Schenck raised tuition for his school and tried to sell lumber to generate the needed funds. He also expanded the practice of taking hunting parties into the forest for a fee, signing a $10,000 annual agreement ($358,333 in today's money) with the Asheville and Chicago Hunting Club while Vanderbilt was in Europe. However, William Howard Taft was elected president in 1908 and announced in 1909 his desire to make lumber free to all Americans through the National Forest program. This quickly put an end to any hopes for forestry profits at Biltmore.

In March 1909, Schenck got into a disagreement with Charles D. Beadle, general manager of the Biltmore Estate, resulting in Beadle charging him for assault and battery for "boxing his ears." The two had been jockeying for position and funding with Vanderbilt. When the court case came before a justice of the peace in Asheville, Schenk was only fined one dollar. However, since their relationship was already tainted, Vanderbilt used this incident and his annoyance over the private hunting contract to ask Schenck to resign on April 24, 1909. Schenck stayed with Biltmore through November 1909, the end of his contract. Schenck also sued Vanderbilt for back pay.

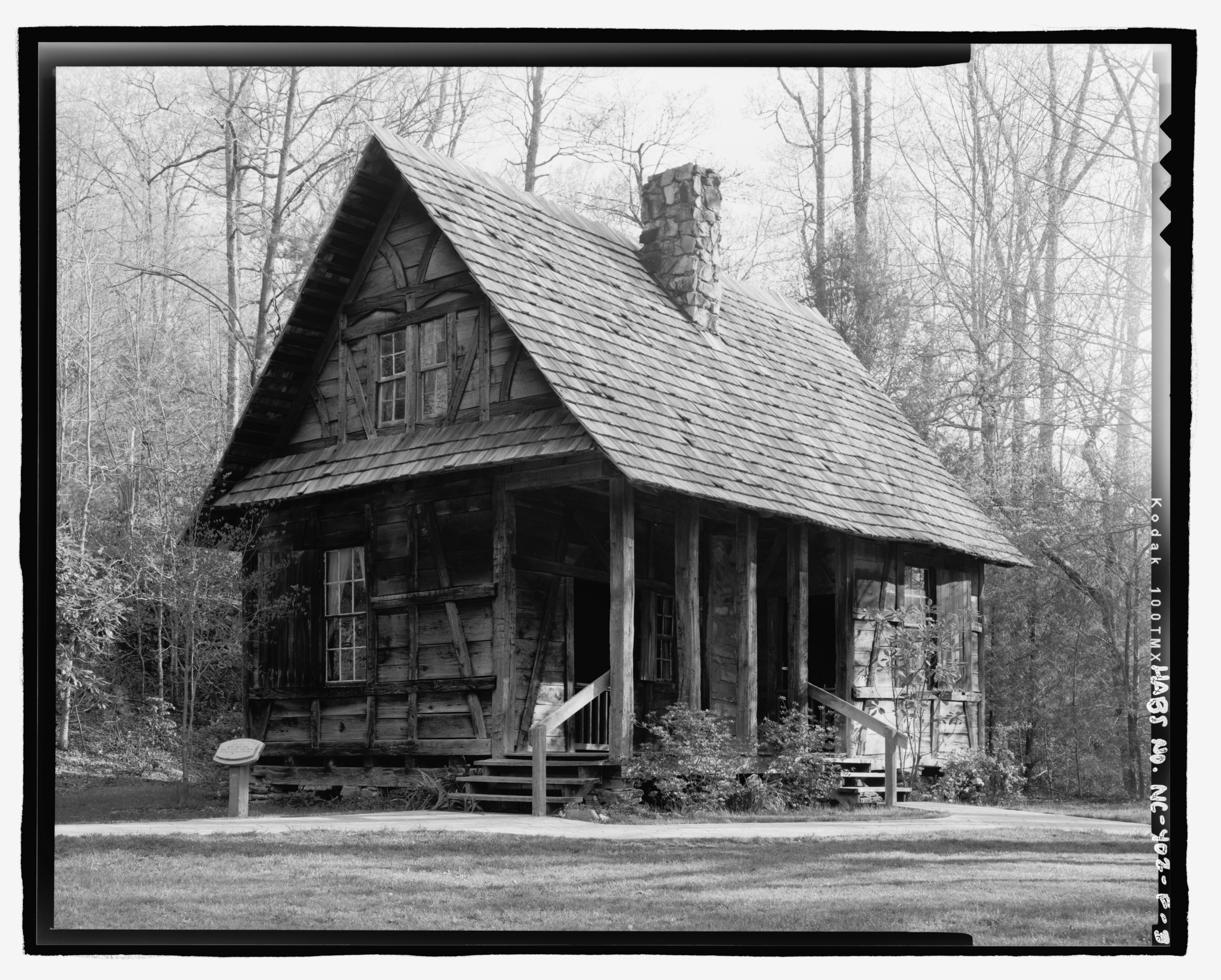
The Black Forest Lodge of the Biltmore Forestry School in Transylvania County, North Carolina

=== Biltmore Forest School ===
In 1898, with the permission of Vanderbilt, Schenck founded the Biltmore Forest School, the first forestry school in North America. The Biltmore Forest School provided a one-year course of study, with a curriculum, focused on pairing traditional classroom lectures with extensive hands-on, practical forest management field training. Schenck operated the school in his spare time on Vanderbilt's lands from 1898 to 1909, turning out many of the leading American foresters of the era.

During the first five years of the school, Schenck's ideology evolved. Historian Jonathan Hill notes that Scheck used his German training but "began to develop his own ideas about forestry and ultimately fashioned his own new and comprehensive model of forestry for the United States." Schenck viewed forestry as a science, balancing forest conservation and economic needs to create a sustainable system.

Although the Biltmore Forest School was financially self-sustaining, Schenck had to change locations after he left Biltmore in 1909. He continued the school through 1913, traveling with his students and operating from Germany and forest locations in several states in America.

=== Lecturer and consultant ===
As a consultant, Schenck helped create the forestry school curriculum at Sewanee: The University of the South. In 1898, he was also a senior consultant for the United States Division of Forestry (now the United States Forestry Service), working under Pinchot. He traveled to the deep South's longleaf pine forests several times to conduct surveys. However, this working relationship only lasted four months because of Pinchot and Schenck's divergence in policy and methodology.

From 1916 to 1918, Schenck was a guest lecturer for forestry at the University of Giessen. After World War I, he was a guest speaker at universities in the United States and also led forestry tours in France, Germany, and Switzerland for American and English students. He wrote articles and textbooks during the 1920s and 1930s and was a consultant in locations around the world. From 1923 to 1937, Schenck was a visiting professor at the Department of Forestry of the University of Montana in Missoula.

After World War II, Schenck assisted United States officials with relief and forestry programs in Germany. The Americans appointed him chief forester in Hessen. In May 1951, he went on a national lecture tour for the American Forestry Association. He also attended a reunion of Biltmore Forest School alumni. He made his last visit to the United States in 1952 when North Carolina State University gave him an honorary degree.

== Honors ==
- Schenck was presented with a ceremonial sword used for deer hunting by the German state of Hessen when he retired in 1939.
- Alumni of the Biltmore Forest School placed a plaque at the site in his honor in 1950. The plaque reads: "Biltmore Forest School, Founded September 1, 1898. This tablet, marking the site of the school building, is erected in honor of Dr. C .A. Schenck, founder of the Biltmore Forest School, the first forestry school in the United States. The Alumni - 1950."
- A redwood grove at Prairie Creek Redwoods State Park, near Orrick, California, was purchased and dedicated in his honor in 1951.
- A longleaf pine plantation near Aiken, South Carolina, was named in his honor in 1951.
- In 1951, a 200,000 acres (81,000 ha) tree farm at Coos Bay, Oregon, was named in his honor.
- North Carolina State University awarded Schenck with an honorary Doctor of Forest Science in 1952
- Named in his honor, the Carl Alwin Schenck Memorial Forest is a 245 acres (99 ha) forest in Wake County, North Carolina, that is maintained by North Carolina State University as a teaching and research forest. A plaque at the site reads, “In memory of Carl Alwin Schenck, 1867-1955. This memorial forest is dedicated to honor a great teacher and founder of the Biltmore Forest School, the first school of forestry in the New World. His ashes have been spread here among the trees he loved.”
- North Carolina State University established its Carl Alwin Schenck Distinguished Professorship of Forest Management in his honor.
- Biltmore Forest School alumni endowed four scholarships in Schenck's honor at North Carolina State University.
- Annually, the Society of American Foresters gives its Carl Alwin Schenck Award for outstanding performance in forestry education.
- In 2015, the Forest History Society funded an Emmy Award-winning documentary about Schenck, America's First Forest: Carl Schenck and the Asheville Experiment.

== Personal life ==
In 1896, Schenck married Adele Bopp (1874–1929) of Darmstadt, Germany. The couple had no children. However, he became the legal guardian of his niece, Olli von Rhoeneck, after her father died in World War I. In 1932, he married widow Marie Louise Faber (1869–1950).

After the Biltmore Forest School closed in 1913, Schenck returned to Germany. Through his family, he was given land in Lindenfels. There, he built a home from the species of trees he encountered in the United States. When World War I began, he joined the German army as a quartermaster and served as a lieutenant on the Eastern front. In Poland, he was shot in the stomach by a Russian soldier and was taken to a Russian prisoner of war camp.

After the war, the economy in Lindenfels was poor. To feed starving German children, Schenck worked with the American Society of Friends (aka Quakers). Schenck felt betrayed by the German government and withdrew from political work, trying to survive on a small pension. Former students also helped to support him. However, Schenck wrote that he "felt no reason to apologize for serving his homeland in its time of need."

During World War II, Schenck stayed in Lindenfels and taught local boys when the schools closed. He also shared care packages that were mailed to him by Biltmore Forest School alumni with his students. After the war, he spent ten years fighting the United States in court to reclaim money and property that was confiscated in the war. However, he was unsuccessful in this Alien Property Custody Suit, despite the efforts of his former students on his behalf.

Schenck died in Lindenfels on May 17, 1955, at the age of 87, after an extended illness. At his request, his funeral was held in Germany, but his ashes were spread at the Schenck Forest in North Carolina.

== Legacy ==
Schenck became one of the most influential people in the field of forestry in the United States, and he trained many of the next generation of leadership in the field. He also invented the Biltmore Stick, which is still used today to measure tree heights and diameters. In addition, Schenck had his students develop the tools and tables that were used by the federal government.

However, Schenck's name was rarely included in histories of forestry, in part, because he was German during an era when the United States fought two wars against Germany. Pinchot wrote, "We in the Division of Forestry fully recognized the necessity for professional education in Forestry in this country, but we had small confidence in the leadership of Dr. Fernow and Dr. Schenck. We distrusted them and their German lack of faith in American Forestry. What we wanted was American foresters trained by Americans in American ways for the work ahead in American forests." After meeting Schenck, President Theodore Roosevelt said, “Nobody has a right to work here for so long without becoming a citizen of the United States!"

Pinchot and Schenck also had differing ideas as to how to manage forests, with the former preferring public lands and the latter preferring private lands. As historian Hill notes, "Though the two shared the common goal of popularizing forestry in the United States, their means of meeting that goal conflicted as much as their definition of forestry." Because Pinchot was in charge of the U.S. Forest Service, his vision dominated and shaped forestry in the United States. However, modern historians have found that Schenck's role was greater than what had been depicted in the historical narrative.

== Selected publications ==
- Our Yellow Poplar: Notes and Tables Showing Contents and Value of Poplar Logs and Poplar Trees . United States, 1896
- White Pine Timber Supplies: Letter from the Secretary of Agriculture, Transmitting, in Response to Senate Resolution of April 14, 1897. with Cornelius Clarkson Vermeule, Gifford Pinchot, Henry Solon Graves, and Robert Thomas Hill. Washington, D.C.: U.S. Government Printing Office, 1896
- Guide for an Excursion through Biltmore Forest, on September 17th and 18th, 1897. United States: American Forestry Association,1897.
- Forestry as Applied to Reservations Used as Parks. United States: American Forestry Association, 1898
- Our Commonwealth and the Necessity of Forest Preservation: Address Delivered at the First Meeting of the North Carolina Forestry Society, at New Bern, N.C., March 2, 1898. North Carolina, 1898 OCLC 887107759
- Forestry for Kentucky: A Steriopticon-Lecture Delivered at the Invitation of the Louisville Board of Trade by C.A. Schenck, Ph. D. Forester of the Biltmore Estate. United States: Louisville Board of Trade, 1899
- In the Woods of Minnesota: This Expert German Forester Travels Over the Site of the Proposed Great National Park and as a Result Presents Some Considerations that the People of the State and Country Cannot Afford to Ignore, Large Profits from Small Expenditure and Labor. United States, G.E. Cole, 1899
- Forestry vs. lumbering. Asheville, NC: The French Broad Press, 1900. OCLC 83896742
- Some Business Problems of American Forestry. Asheville, NC: The French Broad Press, 1900
- The Problem of Forestry in Minnesota. St. Paul, Minn: The Pioneer Press Company, 1900
- The Commercial Side of Governmental and Private Forestry. United States, Pennsylvania Forestry Association, 1901
- Financial Results of Forestry at Biltmore. Asheville, NC, 1903. OCLC 71075215
- Lectures on Forest Policy. Second part, Forestry Conditions in the United States. Asheville, NC: 1904
- Forest Utilization, Mensuration. Sewanee, TN: The University Press, 1904
- Textbooks of Forestry. Sewanee, TN: The University Press, 1904
- Forest Mensuration. Sewanee, TN: The University Press,1905
- Biltmore Lectures on Sylviculture. Albany, NY: Brandow Printing Co., State Legislative Printers, 1905
- Forest Management, 1907
- Cruisers' Tables Giving the Contents of Sound Trees, and their Dependence on Diameter, Number of Logs in the Tree, Taper of Tree and Efficiency of Mill. Biltmore, NC: 1909. OCLC 16654564
- Forest Finance: Guide to Lectures Delivered at the Biltmore Forest School. Asheville, NC: Inland Press, 1909
- Forest Protection: Guide to Lectures Delivered at the Biltmore Forest School. Asheville, NC: Inland Press, 1909
- Forest Policy. 2nd edition. Darmstadt, Germany: C. F. Winter, 1911
- Logging and Lumbering; or, Forest Utilization. A Textbook for Forest Schools. Darmstadt, Germany: L.C. Wittich, 1912.
- The Art of the Second Growth, Or American Sylviculture. 3rd edition. Albany: Brandow Printing Company, 1912
- Forest Utilization in Europe: Germany, Norway, Sweden,, Czechslovokia, Finland, France. Washington, D.C.: National Lumber Manufacturers Association, 1924.
- Precarious Situation in World's Spruce Wood Supply. Canada, F.J.D. Barnjum, 1930
- Forestry in Germany: Present and Prospective. United States, Newsprint Service Bureau, 1948.
- The Biltmore Immortals: Biographies of 50 American Boys Graduating from the Biltmore Forest School which was the First School of American Forestry on American Soil. 2 volumes. Darmstadt, Germany: L.C. Wittich, 1950. OCLC 7152082
- The Cavalcade of Trees for the Great: Being the Tour of Carl Alwin Schenck in America. St. Paul: American Forestry Association, 1951. OCLC 258318466
- The Biltmore Story: Recollections of the Beginning of Forestry in the United States. St. Paul: American Forest History Foundation, 1955
- The Birth of Forestry in America: Biltmore Forest School, 1898-1913. Durham, NC: The Forest History Society and the Appalachian Consortium, 1974 ISBN 089030002X
- Cradle of Forestry in America: The Biltmore Forest School, 1898-1913. Introduction by Steven Anderson. Durham, NC: Forest History Society, 1998 ISBN 0890300550
- The Forestry Interests of the South. Reprint from the Tradesman.(n.d.) OCLC 315735331
