= The Center for Healthcare Governance =

- Established: 2004
- Type: Health Care, Governance and Leadership organization
- Headquarters: Chicago, Illinois
- Key people: John R. Combes, MD (President & COO); John G. King (Chairman of the National Board of Advisors); David L. Bernd (Chairman of the Board of Managers)
- Website: www.americangovernance.com

The American Hospital Association's Center for Healthcare Governance (The center) is a membership based organization that is affiliated with the AHA. Founded in 2004 and based in Chicago, Illinois, Center members include more than 500 hospital and health system boards and other organizations that serve the health care sector. The center also provides governance resources and services to the more than 5,000 member organizations of the American Hospital Association. The Mission of the center is to bring about excellence and accountability in governance by being the valued source, for health care leaders and trustees, of innovative governance thinking, information, tools and content. The center is governed by a board of managers and also receives guidance on program and service development from a national board of advisors.

== Governance education and development ==
Each year the Center develops and conducts educational programs tailored to a variety of board needs. Programs include:

- Two National Symposia on Leading and Governing Healthcare Organizations
- Governance sessions at:

- Health Forum Rural Health Care Leadership Conference
- AHA Annual Membership Meetings
- Health Forum and AHA Leadership Summit

- Bimonthly health care governance Webinars
- 4 to 6 Hospital Trustee Professionalism programs
- The Center provides speakers, including Jamie Orlikoff, Connie Curran, Paul Keckley, and David Nygren, and assists health care organizations to plan for and conduct health care governance education programs and retreats through its Speaker’s Express service. This also includes the center's Quality Curriculum for Trustees.
- With the AHA's Institute for Diversity in Health Management, the Center provides education for diverse candidates desiring to serve on hospital boards and maintains an online registry of these candidates.

== Publications ==
The Center provides articles, monographs, books, tools and special reports on governance and leadership issues, including:

- Center Voices columns appearing in each issue of Trustee magazine
- Trustee Workbooks appearing quarterly in Trustee
- Periodic Governance Insights columns in Healthcare Executive
- Monographs providing in-depth coverage on selected topics
- An array of books for boards and executives through the center's online store
- A Resource Repository containing more than 150 governance tools that can be downloaded and adapted by individual boards as well as an online library of articles and information on specific governance topics
- Reports of the findings and recommendations of blue ribbon panels on health care governance and trustee core competencies

=== Guide to Good Governance ===
The Guide to Good Governance for Hospitals is a comprehensive overview of governing board roles and responsibilities and the key components of good governance practice and contains tools to support a board to effectively govern.

== Research and assessment ==
In collaboration with the Health Research and Educational Trust (HRET) the center conducts national governance surveys, providing in-depth information on board structure, functions, and trends and more focused research on specific governance topics, such as the credit crisis and governance and board/physician relationships.

The center also offers a Governance Assessment Process (GAP) which provides resources and services for evaluating the performance of hospital and health systems boards as well as individual board members.

== Blue Ribbon Panel Report: Building an Exceptional Board ==
This report, published in 2007, provides an overview of five key board issues that are critical to effective governance and includes more than 15 sample tools and resources that boards have applied to move their performance from good to great. It also includes an overview of stretch practices for exceptional boards.

== Blue Ribbon Panel Report: Competency-Based Governance ==
This report, published in 2009, reviews application of governance and leadership competencies in for-profit and non-profit organizations, within and outside of healthcare. The panel recommended two sets of core competencies for hospital and health system trustees, included in this report, and also provided a series of recommendations to further incorporate the use of competencies through additional education, research and application to board practices.

=== Blue Ribbon Work Group on Competency-Based Governance ===
Work is now underway to develop and test a variety of tools to apply governance competencies recommended by the Blue Ribbon Panel to board practices, such as trustee recruitment and selection, performance evaluation, board education and leadership development and succession planning.

== Access to experts ==
The Center provides access to a wide range of governance and leadership experts through its educational programs, Qualified Consulting service and Speakers Express online resource.
