= Society for Healthcare Strategy and Market Development =

The Society for Healthcare Strategy and Market Development (SHSMD) is a U.S.-based professional association and group associated with the American Hospital Association. SHSMD members represent healthcare-specific disciplines such as marketing, communications, public relations, strategic planning, business development, physician relations, sales, and government and public affairs. SHSMD has more than 4,500 members nationally from hospitals, healthcare systems/networks and consulting firms. According to its website, it was formed from the merger of The American Society for Health Care Marketing and Public Relations (founded in 1964) and the Society for Healthcare Planning and Marketing (founded in 1977) in 1996. Regional chapters criss-cross the country and are represented in every state, often with their own conferences.

== Education ==
Its affiliation with the AHA allows members access to AHA resources, advocacy efforts and alerts, and discounts on AHA products and services. SHSMD members also have access to the Association for Community Health Improvement’s Community Health Assessment Toolkit. Online and in-person educational programs are also offered such as Essentials of Healthcare Marketing, Planning, and PR/Communications; Raising the Bar in Healthcare Marketing, Planning, and PR/Communications, and an annual conference to assist in developing the broadest strategic outlook or honing the most specific skill set.

== Research ==
SHSMD's research is used by hospitals nationwide, and often partnerships with various firms work on specialized research such as hospital-physician relations. Major research efforts include By The Numbers, a benchmarking study of common questions, and Futurescan, SHSMD's annual guide to healthcare trends. Currently being updated for 2008, the Salary Compensation and Work Satisfaction Survey report provides analysis on salary, compensation and work satisfaction.
