= Irvine Page =

American physiologist (1901–1991)

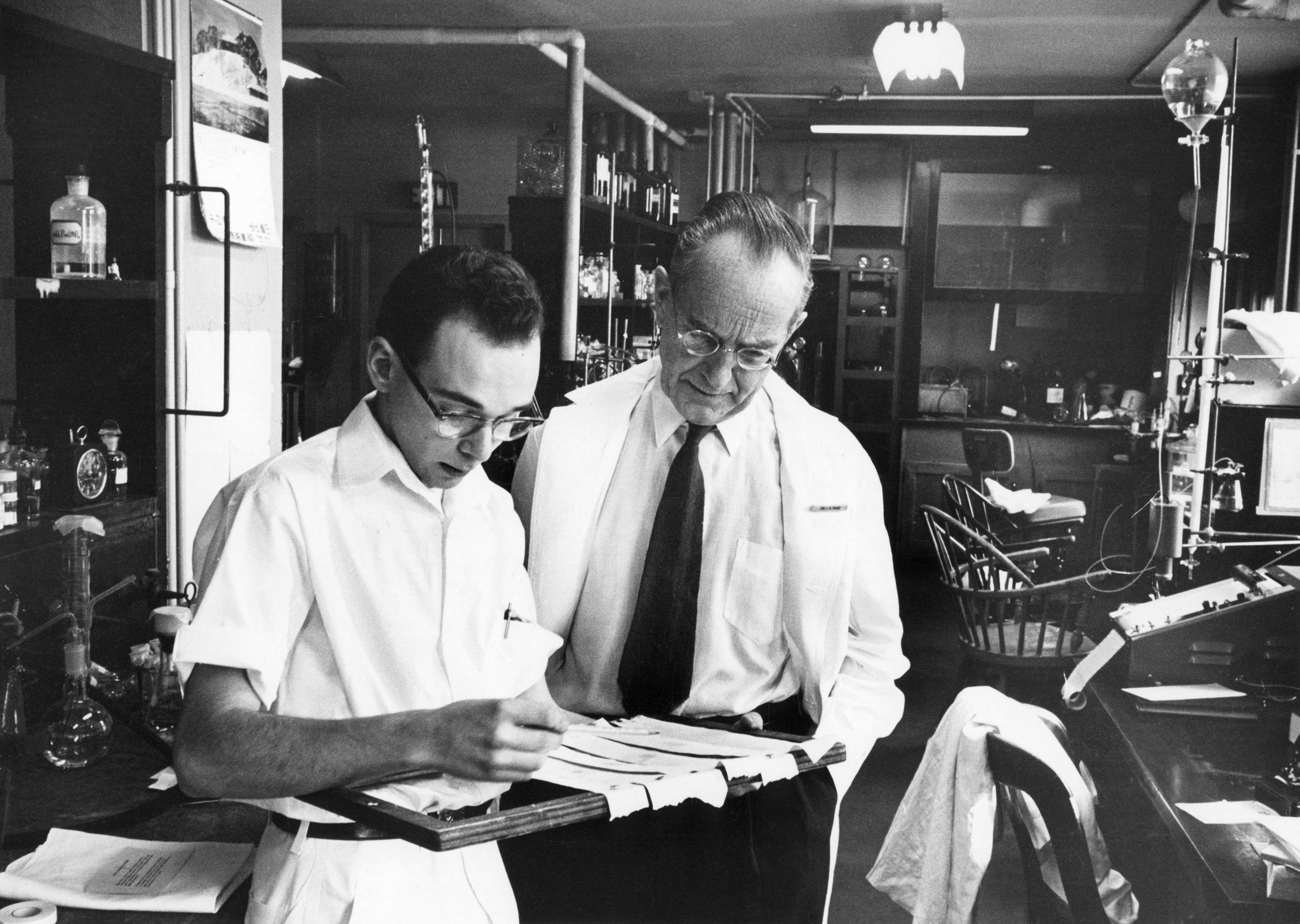
- Page (right) and lab tech in the 1960s
- Born: Irvine Heinly Page; January 7, 1901; Indianapolis, Indiana, US
- Died: June 10, 1991 (aged 90); Hyannis Port, Massachusetts, US
- Education: Cornell University
- Known for: Studies of hypertension
- Spouse: Beatrice Allen
- Children: Two sons, Christopher, Nicholas
- Relatives: Ruth Page (sister)
- Awards: Ida B. Gould Memorial Award of the American Association for the Advancement of Science, Lasker Award, Gairdner Foundation International Award, Oscar B. Hunter Award, Golden Plate Award of the American Academy of Achievement, Passano Foundation Award
- Scientific career
- Fields: Physiology
- Workplaces: Kaiser Wilhelm Institute in Munich, Rockefeller Institute for Medical Research, Cleveland Clinic
- Academic advisors: Donald Van Slyke

Irvine Heinly Page (January 7, 1901 – June 10, 1991) was an American physiologist who played an important part in the field of hypertension for almost 60 years while working at the Cleveland Clinic as the first Chair of Research.

== Early life and education ==
Irvine Page was born on January 7, 1901, in Indianapolis, Indiana. He attended college at Cornell University, with an undergraduate degree in chemistry (1921) and an M.D. degree in 1926. Page completed his internship at Presbyterian and Bellevue Hospitals in New York City.

== Career ==
After completing his internship, Page then performed research in physical chemistry at Woods Hole and then New York. In 1928 he joined the Kaiser Wilhelm Institute in Munich, Germany where he started a new department of neurochemistry. With the coming rise to power of Hitler, Page left Munich in 1931 to work with Donald Van Slyke at The Rockefeller Institute for Medical Research in New York City. He worked at the Rockefeller Institute through 1937. Page then moved back to Indianapolis as Director of the Laboratory for Clinical Research at Eli Lilly at City Hospital. In 1945, Page then organized a new research division at the Cleveland Clinic.

His first contributions were published in the early 1930s and his most recent, "Hypertension Research: A Memoir: 1920–1960", in 1988. He is perhaps best known for the co-discovery of serotonin in 1948, although his pre-eminence is a matter of record in four other areas: the renin–angiotensin system, the mosaic theory of hypertension, treatment of hypertension and public and professional advocacy of the recognition of this condition and its effects in daily life. In earlier work he published on the neurochemistry of the brain.

Page received many honors for his work. He was on the cover of Time magazine in 1955. He was president of the American Heart Association (1956–57); he received ten honorary degrees and a number of prestigious awards—the Ida B. Gould Memorial Award of the American Association for the Advancement of Science (1957); Albert Lasker Award (1958); Gairdner Foundation International Award (1963); Distinguished Award of the American Medical Association (1964); Oscar B. Hunter Award (1966); Golden Plate Award of the American Academy of Achievement (1966); Passano Foundation Award (1967); and the Stouffer Prize (now the Novartis Award) for Hypertension Research in 1970. He was elected to the National Academy of Sciences in 1971 and published his memoirs in 1988.

The American Heart Association Irvine H. Page Young Investigator Research Award and the Irvine Page – Alva Bradley Lifetime Achievement Award are named in his honor.

== Later life ==
A collection of his papers is held at the National Library of Medicine in Bethesda, Maryland.

=== Personal life ===
He was married to Beatrice Allen, a dancer, poet, and author of the book, The Bracelet. His sister was Ruth Page, a noted American ballet dancer. Page was also a gifted musician, a trait he passed on to his two sons, Christopher Page and Nicholas Page. Page lived in Cleveland, OH with his wife and children, summering in Hyannis Port on Cape Cod. His family home on the Cape is now owned and occupied by his granddaughter and great-grandchildren.

=== Death ===
Having retired to Hyannis Port, Massachusetts, Page died suddenly on June 10, 1991, at the age of 90. He had been previously injured in an auto accident in March 1990 and suffered from poor health due to a prior stroke and a prior heart attack.

== Selected publications ==
- Page, Irvine (1987). Hypertension Mechanisms. Orlando, Fla.: Grune & Stratton. ISBN 978-0-8089-1768-7.
- Page, Irvine (1988). Hypertension Research: A Memoir : 1920-1960. New York: Pergamon. ISBN 978-0-08-036079-9.
- Page, Irvine (1937). Chemistry of the brain. New York: C.C. Thomas. ASIN B-000-87D23-C.
- Page, Irvine (1972). Speaking to the Doctor: His Responsibilities and Opportunities: Selected Editorials from Modern Medicine. Minneapolis: Proforum.
