= Cleveland Clinic =

American health care nonprofit

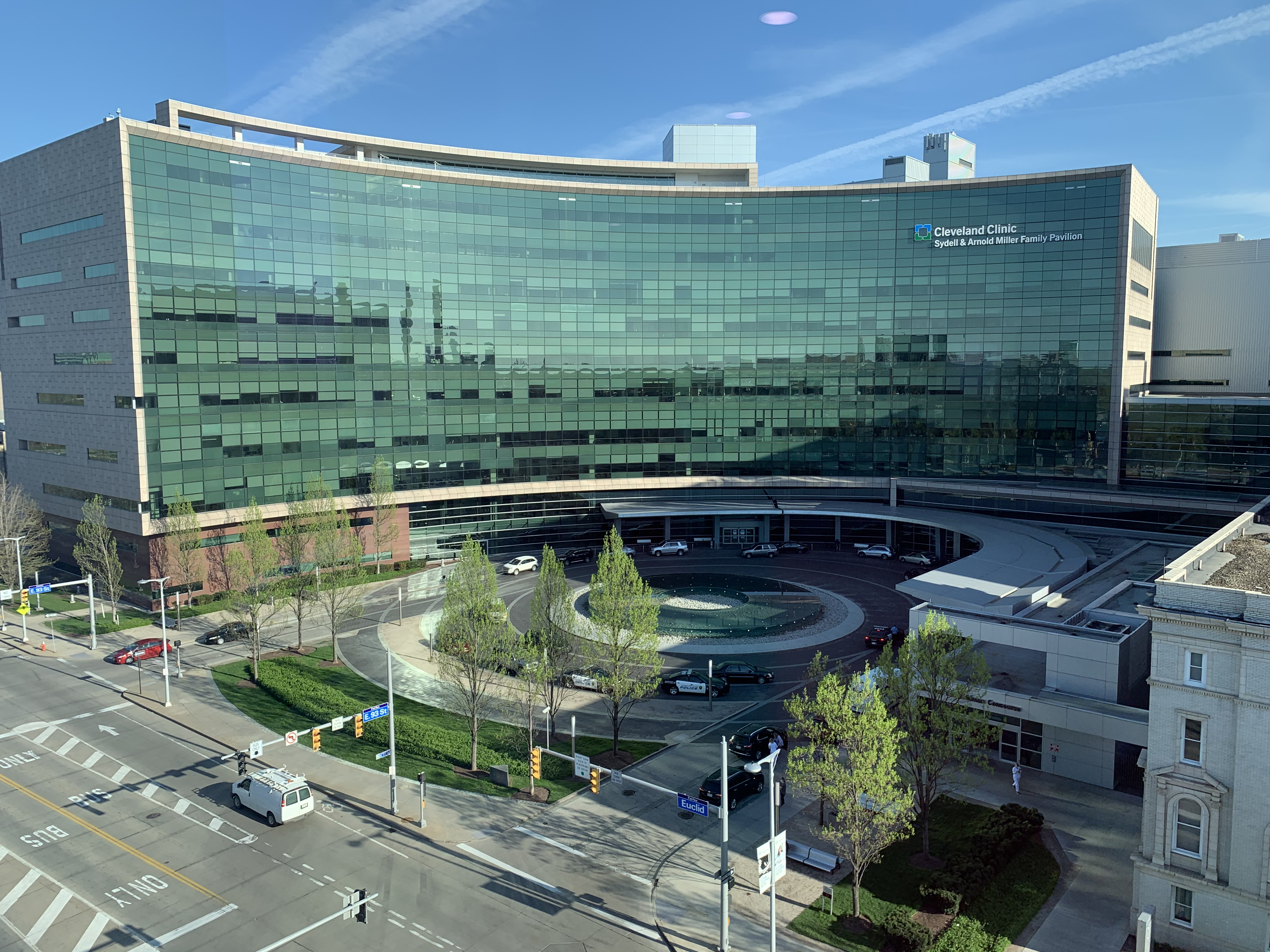
- Cleveland Clinic (Miller Family Pavilion)

Geography
- Location: 9500 Euclid Avenue, Cleveland, Ohio, United States
- Coordinates: 41°30′9″N 81°37′16″W

Organization
- Care system: Private
- Type: Teaching
- Affiliated university: Cleveland Clinic Lerner College of Medicine; Case Western Reserve University School of Medicine; Heritage College of Osteopathic Medicine; Kent State University College of Podiatric Medicine

Services
- Emergency department: Level II trauma center
- Beds: 1,300 (Main Campus); Total beds in Cleveland Clinic Foundation: 6,026

Helipads
- Helipad: FAA LID: 6OI8
Number	Length		Surface
Number	ft	m	Surface
H11,289	55	17	Concrete

History
- Founded: February 28, 1921; 105 years ago

Links
- Website: clevelandclinic.org
- Lists: Hospitals in Ohio

Cleveland Clinic is an American nonprofit academic medical center based in Cleveland, Ohio. Owned and operated by the Cleveland Clinic Foundation, an Ohio nonprofit corporation, Cleveland Clinic was founded in 1921 by a group of faculty and alumni from the Case Western Reserve University School of Medicine. Cleveland Clinic is consistently ranked as one of the best hospitals in the United States. For the past twenty years in the fields of cardiology, heart, and vascular surgery, Cleveland Clinic has been ranked and regarded as the best and highest-performing hospital in the world. In 2018–2019, the U.S. News & World Report ranked Cleveland Clinic as the number 2 hospital in the Best Hospitals Honor Roll, as it was nationally ranked in 14 adult and 10 pediatric specialties.

The Clinic runs a 170-acre (69-hectare) main campus in Cleveland, as well as 15 affiliated hospitals, 20 family health centers in Northeast Ohio, 5 affiliated hospitals in Florida, and cancer center in Nevada. International operations include the Cleveland Clinic Abu Dhabi hospital in the United Arab Emirates and Cleveland Clinic Canada, which has two executive health and sports medicine clinics in Toronto. Another hospital campus in the United Kingdom, Cleveland Clinic London, opened to outpatients in 2021 and fully opened in 2022. Cleveland Clinic conducts its pediatric operations through the Cleveland Clinic Children's Hospital. Tomislav Mihaljevic is the president and CEO.

Cleveland Clinic's operating revenue in 2024 was $15.94 billion and its operating income $276 million. That year it recorded 15.96 million patient visits, 332,991 admissions, and 82,608 employees. It is affiliated with Case Western Reserve University School of Medicine, with which it started a physician-investigator medical training program: the Cleveland Clinic Lerner College of Medicine. Cleveland Clinic is also the teaching hospital for Ohio University Heritage College of Osteopathic Medicine and Kent State University College of Podiatric Medicine. In addition, Cleveland Clinic has 1,974 residents and fellows in 104 training programs approved by the Accreditation Council for Graduate Medical Education (ACGME). The Cleveland Clinic publishes the peer-reviewed journal Cleveland Clinic Journal of Medicine.

== History ==
=== Beginnings ===
The organization grew out of the surgical practice of Frank J. Weed (died 1891) at 16 Church Street on the near-west side of Cleveland. The practice was purchased by his two assistants, Frank E. Bunts and George Washington Crile. In 1892 they were joined by Crile's cousin, William E. Lower, and in 1897 the practice moved to the Osborn Building on Prospect Avenue, downtown Cleveland.

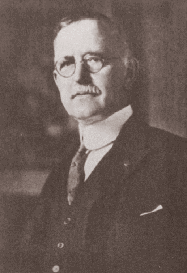
Frank Emory Bunts

A four-story outpatient building was constructed, and Cleveland Clinic was dedicated at a private ceremony on February 26, 1921. It opened its doors two days later to the public and registered 42 patients. By April 1921, it had 60 employees, including 14 physicians and four nurses. In 1922 the founders purchased four private homes nearby for hospitalization, radiation treatment, and administration. A fifth house was acquired as a residence for patients with diabetes receiving insulin treatments. To meet rising patient volume, a 184-bed hospital was built in 1924, located at East 90th Street and Carnegie Avenue. A power plant, laundry, and ice plant were also built. A research laboratory was constructed in 1928.

=== Cleveland Clinic fire ===
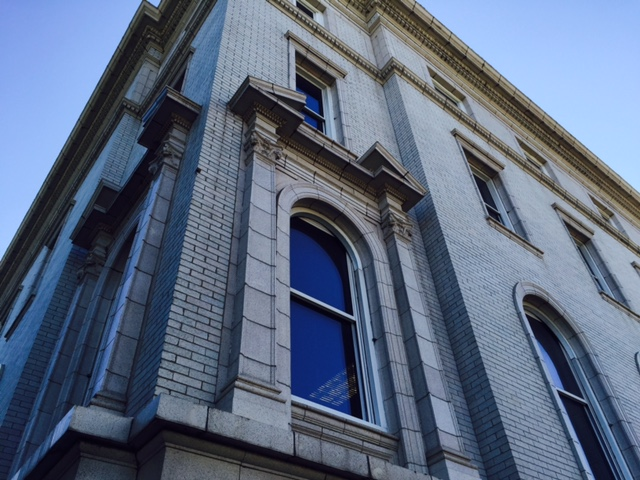
Cleveland Clinic's original building, built in 1921

On May 15, 1929, nitrocellulose x-ray films stored in the basement of the outpatient building ignited. An explosion sent a cloud of toxic oxides of nitrogen and carbon though the building. One hundred and twenty-three people, including John Phillips, one of the founders, lost their lives. A dozen investigating agencies were not able to determine what had caused the fire. Cleveland Clinic's own inquiry narrowed the possible causes down to spontaneous combustion caused by heat; a discarded cigarette or match; and contact with an extension cord light hung over a stack of films.

Philanthropist Samuel Livingston Mather II formed a committee of 36 community leaders to help Cleveland Clinic reestablish itself in temporary quarters across the street. Patient care services resumed five days later. The 1921 building was completely renovated, and a new three-story clinic building, with a new main entrance, was added in 1931. All debts were repaid by 1941.

=== Growth of specialization ===
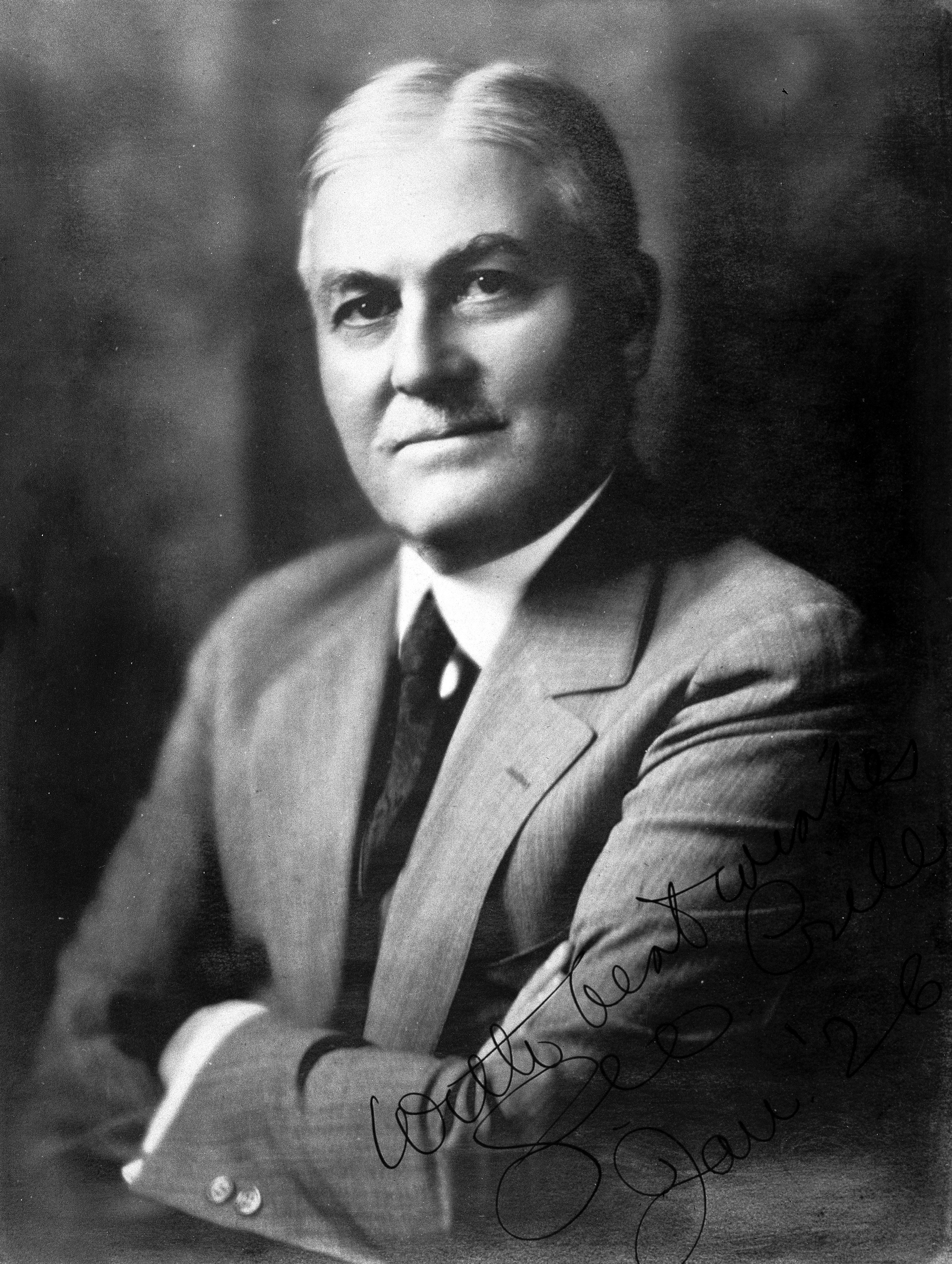
George Washington Crile, one of the founders

Cleveland Clinic built new operating rooms in the early 1970s to accommodate the growth of cardiac surgery. The Martha Holden Jennings Education Building opened in 1964, with an auditorium named for Dr. Bunts. A new hospital building (currently home to Cleveland Clinic Children's Hospital) opened in 1966, and a research building opened in 1974 (demolished in 2007). A pathology and laboratory medicine building was constructed on Carnegie Avenue in 1980.

William S. Kiser, chairman of the board 1977–1989, led the development of a strategic plan to accommodate growing patient volumes in the late 1970s. This resulted in a group of buildings known as the Century Project. Completed in 1985, the Century Project includes a 14-story outpatient building (now known as the Crile Building) designed by architect Cesar Pelli.

In September 2014, the Cleveland Clinic opened the center for Functional Medicine, directed by Mark Hyman. Other alternative medicine offerings at the Cleveland Clinic, such as reiki and hypnotherapy, came under controversy in 2017 after a then-Cleveland Clinic physician published an anti-vaccine article. then-CEO Toby Cosgrove stated that this was in response to patients who "want more than conventional medicine can offer." Nonetheless, shortly afterward, the hospital stopped selling some homeopathic products and discontinued online sales of wellness products.

In 2026, under threat from the Trump administration Department of Justice, the Cleveland Clinic agreed to open the nation's second "detransition clinic" for those who had previously received transgender healthcare - this development shortly following a similar arrangement involving Texas Children's Hospital.

== Research and education ==
The Cleveland Clinic Lerner Research Institute (LRI) conducts biomedical research in a 480,000-square-foot building that opened in 1999, following a $16 million donation from Al and Norma Lerner in 1997, the largest single charitable donation made to the Cleveland Clinic up until that point. LRI hosts graduate student research through joint PhD programs in conjunction with nearby universities, including Case Western Reserve University, Cleveland State University (including an NIH-funded PhD program for minority and underrepresented students in science, technology, engineering, and mathematics), Kent State University and the University of Akron.

In 2002, the Lerners eclipsed their previous gift and made a $100 million donation to establish the Cleveland Clinic Lerner College of Medicine (CCLCM) within Case Western Reserve University School of Medicine, opening in 2004. Physician researcher Eric Topol played an important role in securing the donation from the Lerner family. Topol served as Provost and Chief Academic Officer at CCLCM until 2006, when his position was eliminated amid controversy regarding his criticism of Vioxx and disagreements with other Cleveland Clinic leaders, including then-CEO Toby Cosgrove. CCLCM is a five-year medical school program affiliated with the Case Western Reserve University School of Medicine with 32 students per class, each receiving a scholarship for full tuition and fees. While traditional MD-granting medical schools in the U.S. are four-year programs, the extra year in the program is dedicated to a year of research. The curriculum is notable for its lack of class rank, pre-clinical or clinical grading, or end-of-course examinations.

In 2019, Cleveland Clinic and Case Western opened the Samson Pavilion Health Education Campus on the campus of the Cleveland Clinic, a $515 million building project, amid a multi-million dollar joint fundraising campaign between CWRU and the Cleveland Clinic. The campus houses students Case Western Reserve School of Medicine (CCLCM and traditional MD programs), Frances Payne Bolton School of Nursing and Case School of Dental Medicine, all of which—with the exception of CCLCM—had previously held classes on the campus of CWRU and University Hospitals Cleveland Medical Center. The move, announced in 2013, was a major contributing factor for University Hospitals to shift its name from University Hospitals Case Medical Center to University Hospitals Cleveland Medical Center in 2016, as well as renegotiate its affiliation agreement with CWRU that same year.

Cleveland Clinic publishes the peer-reviewed Cleveland Clinic Journal of Medicine monthly, focusing on internal medicine, endocrinology, and diabetes.

== Reputation ==
Cleveland Clinic is one of the top hospital systems in the United States, and is well regarded particularly in technological management systems.

=== Rankings ===
In 2020–2021, Cleveland Clinic was ranked as the #2 overall hospital in the United States by the U.S. News & World Report, behind the Mayo Clinic in Rochester, Minnesota. A total of 4,656 hospitals were considered in 12 main data-driven medical and surgical specialty areas and four additional specialty areas, collating data on patient safety, performance measures, and complication rates. Cleveland Clinic was found to be nationally ranked in 14 adult specialties and 10 children's specialties and was recognized as the #1 hospital in Ohio and in the Cleveland Metropolitan Area. It also achieved the highest rating possible in 9 specified procedures or conditions: abdominal aortic aneurysm repair, aortic valve surgery, chronic obstructive pulmonary disease, colon cancer surgery, heart bypass surgery, heart failure, hip replacement, knee replacement, and lung cancer surgery. In addition, for the 14th year in a row, Cleveland Clinic was ranked as the #1 hospital in the United States for cardiology and heart surgery as a specialty. Similarly, in 2021, Newsweek named Cleveland Clinic the number 2 hospital in the world, behind Mayo Clinic.

In 2021, Gartner ranked Cleveland Clinic as the #1 healthcare supply chain.

In 2022, the American Hospital Association (AHA) partnered with the Society for Healthcare Strategy and Market Development to engage the branding agency, Monigle, to conduct consumer research with 28,000 Americans to rank hospital brands "… on their performance in delivering a humanized experience". The Cleveland Clinic was ranked first, followed by two other Ohio systems. Other systems, including Johns Hopkins ranked 6th; Mass General, 11th; and the Mayo Clinic ranked 15th.

=== Safety ===
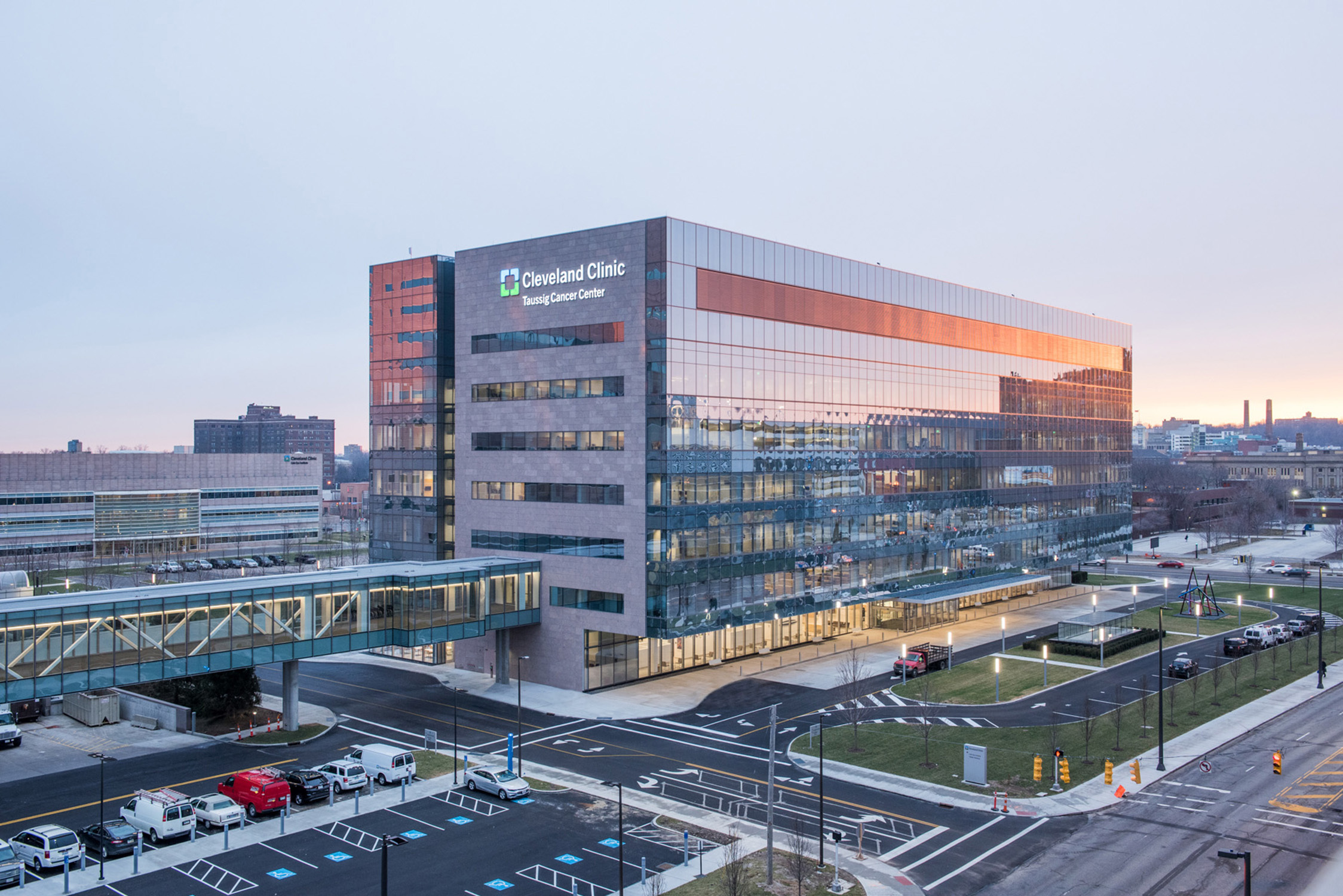
Cleveland Clinic Taussig Cancer Center

In a Kaiser Family Foundation review of Centers for Medicare and Medicaid Services (CMS) data for hospital acquired conditions in 2014, Cleveland Clinic received an 8.7 score (1–10 possible, with 10 being the worst), in the bottom 7% of hospitals.

Between 2010 and 2013, CMS undertook an extensive series of investigations into the Cleveland Clinic Foundation, with at least a dozen inspections and follow-up visits triggered by patient complaints. An analysis of Medicare inspection data between 2011 and 2014 found that the Cleveland Clinic Foundation was one of at least 230 instances in which validated serious incidents—dubbed "immediate jeopardy" complaints—led CMS to threaten loss of ability to serve Medicare patients unless the problems were fixed immediately. Due to numerous serious ongoing safety violations, the Cleveland Clinic Foundation was on payment termination track for 19 months, placing at stake $1B in annual Medicare/Medicaid reimbursement. The citations were reported and analyzed in detail by Modern Healthcare, which posted some of the safety documents.

In its 2020 Overall Hospital Quality Star Ratings, CMS gave a five-star rating to the Cleveland Clinic, as well as several community hospitals in the Cleveland Clinic system, including Fairview Hospital, Hillcrest Hospital, and Lutheran Hospital. In these ratings, Cleveland Clinic Martin North Hospital received a one-star rating.

During the early phase of the COVID-19 pandemic, administration at the Cleveland Clinic initially instructed employees that they were not allowed to wear face masks outside of patient care areas. The Cleveland Clinic stated they made this decision as they felt the current body of evidence at the time did not support their use. Other hospitals, however, required such masks. Later, with growing evidence of mask efficacy, this policy were revised and all staff members were required to wear cloth or protective masks. Masks were obtained from a variety of sources, including Amish and sports apparel manufacturers, among other suppliers.

In 2021, amid the COVID-19 pandemic, the Cleveland Clinic permitted its staff to be unvaccinated against COVID.

== Locations ==
Cleveland Clinic operates 19 family health and ambulatory surgery centers in surrounding communities, a 1,000 bed multispecialty hospital and family health center in Weston, Florida, and two Cleveland Clinic Canada locations in Toronto, Canada. The system operates 11 affiliated hospitals in northeast Ohio, numbering 2,588 total beds. Additionally Cleveland Clinic operates five affiliated hospitals in Florida with 289 total beds, Cleveland Clinic Abu Dhabi with 564 total beds, and London, United Kingdom with 185 total beds; for a grand total of 6,026 beds.

=== Ohio locations ===
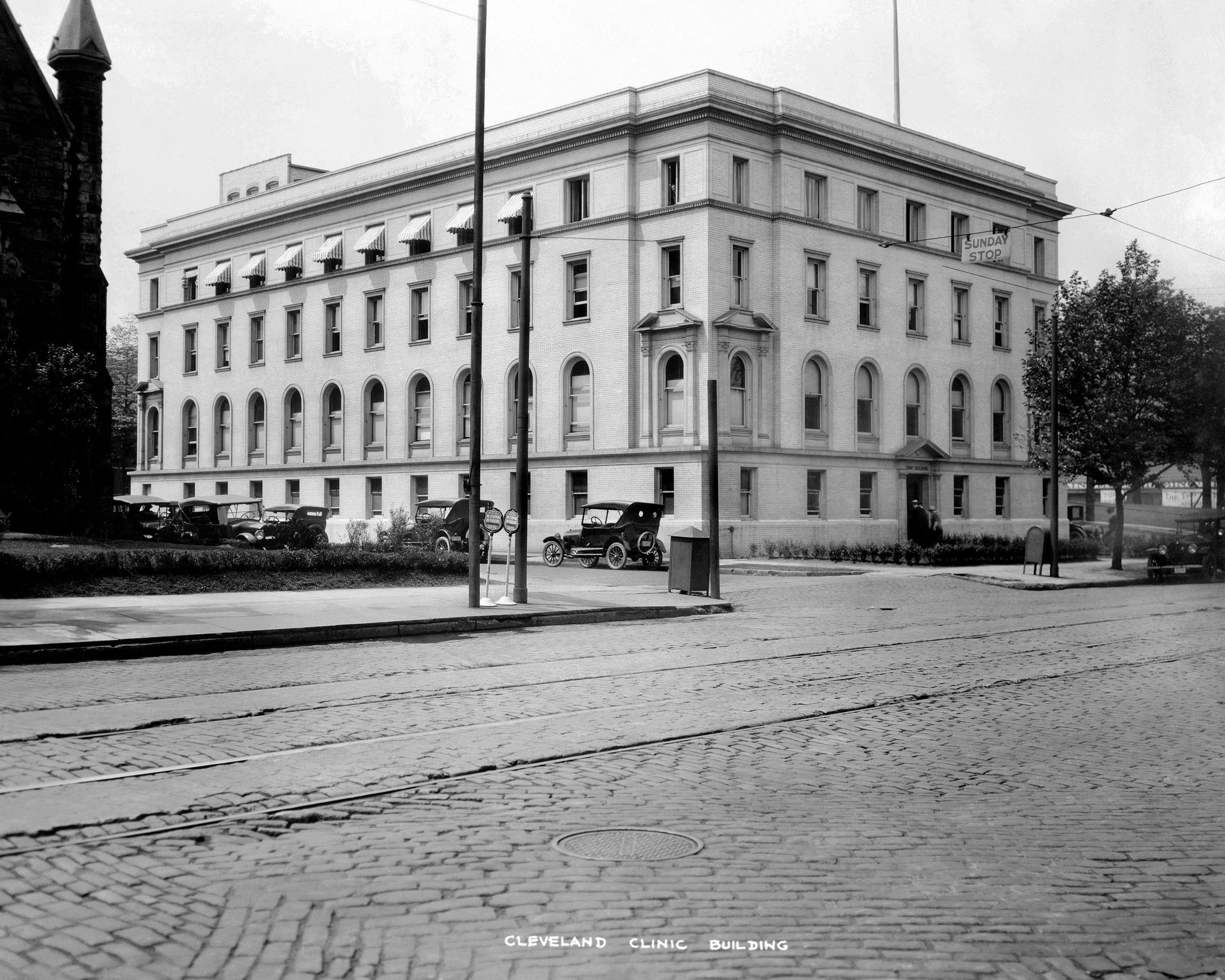
Cleveland Clinic original building, located on the main campus along Euclid Ave., built in 1921

Cleveland Clinic's main campus consists of 60 buildings on 170 acres (69 ha) near University Circle, in Fairfax, Cleveland.

In 1996, the Cleveland Clinic took over Fairview Health System centered on Fairview Hospital and serving the West Side of Cleveland and the western suburbs. In the same year, the Cleveland Clinic also took over the four-hospital Meridia Health System, absorbing Euclid Hospital in Euclid, Hillcrest Hospital in Mayfield Heights, Huron Hospital in East Cleveland, and South Pointe Hospital in Warrensville Heights. In October 2010, the Cleveland Clinic announced plans to close the Level II Trauma Center at Huron Hospital, prompting a joint lawsuit from the cities of Cleveland and East Cleveland, which was later dropped after the Clinic delayed closure plans. In 2011, amid criticism from residents and leaders in East Cleveland, the Clinic closed Huron Hospital, replacing it with a community health center and leaving the east side of Cleveland without a trauma center until University Hospitals opened a Level I trauma center in 2015. In May 2017 Cleveland Clinic reached an agreement to acquire the 150-bed Union Hospital in Dover, Ohio. In February 2021, Mercy Medical Center in Canton, Ohio became a full member of the Cleveland Clinic health system, while retaining its Catholic affiliation through sponsorship with the Sisters of Charity of St. Augustine.

==== Cleveland Clinic Akron General ====
Cleveland Clinic Akron General, formerly known as Akron General Medical Center, and commonly known as Akron Gen, is a nationally ranked, 511-bed non-profit, teaching hospital located in Akron, Ohio. In August 2015, the Akron General Health System joined the Cleveland Clinic Health System. Akron General includes Akron General Hospital, Visiting Nurse Service and Affiliates, Hospice of VNS, Akron General Lodi Hospital, the Edwin Shaw Rehabilitation Institute, and three health and wellness centers. As the hospital is a teaching hospital, it is affiliated with the Northeast Ohio Medical University and the Ohio University Heritage College of Osteopathic Medicine. Cleveland Clinic Akron General's Paramedic Education Program was initiated in 1976 as a commitment to the community in providing pre-hospital care to citizen within Summit County and adjoining areas. The hospital is also an American College of Surgeons verified Level 1 Trauma Center, the one of three in the region and one of 11 in Ohio, the other two in Cleveland. Additionally, the hospital has a rooftop helipad to handle the emergent transport of critical patients to and from the hospital.

==== Cleveland Clinic Children's ====
Cleveland Clinic Children's (CCC) is a pediatric acute care children's teaching hospital located in Cleveland, Ohio on the main campus of Cleveland Clinic. The hospital has 389 pediatric beds and is affiliated with Cleveland Clinic Lerner College of Medicine, Case Western Reserve University School of Medicine, Heritage College of Osteopathic Medicine and Kent State University College of Podiatric Medicine. The hospital provides comprehensive pediatric specialties and subspecialties to infants, children, teens, and young adults aged 0–21 throughout Cleveland and the wider northern Ohio region. Cleveland Clinic Children's Hospital also sometimes treats adults that require pediatric care. The hospital is a few blocks away from the Ronald McDonald House of Cleveland.

==== Ohio regional hospitals ====
- Akron General
- Akron General Lodi Hospital
- Avon Hospital
- Children's Hospital for Rehabilitation
- Euclid Hospital
- Fairview Hospital
- Hillcrest Hospital
- Lutheran Hospital
- Marymount Hospital
- Medina Hospital
- Mentor Hospital
- Mercy Hospital
- South Pointe Hospital
- Union Hospital

Former Ohio hospitals

- Grace Hospital (affiliate)
- "Hope Hospital"
- Huron Hospital
- Lakewood Hospital

=== Cleveland Clinic Florida ===
- Indian River Hospital
- Martin North Hospital
- Martin South Hospital
- Tradition Hospital
- Weston Hospital

Former Florida hospitals

- Florida Hospital (North Beach)
- Naples Hospital

=== Cleveland Clinic Nevada ===
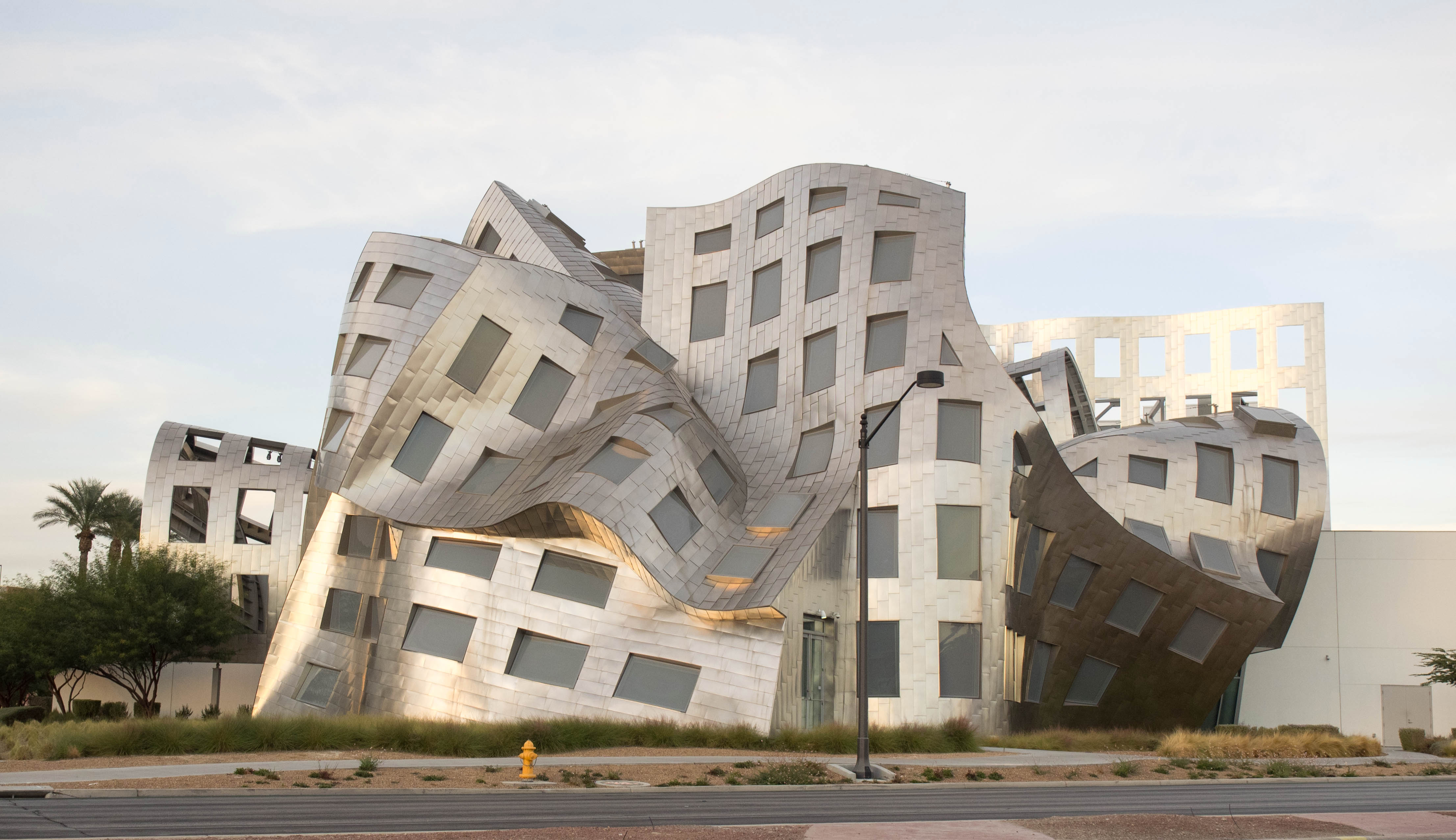
Frank Gehry-designed Lou Ruvo Center for Brain Health, Las Vegas, Nevada

In May 2010, Cleveland Clinic's Lou Ruvo Center for Brain Health opened in a unique structure designed by architect Frank Gehry in Las Vegas, Nevada. In 2018, the Indian River Medical Center in Vero Beach, Florida, and Martin Health, consisting of a hospital in Port St. Lucie and two hospitals in Stuart, Florida, joined the Cleveland Clinic system.

=== International locations ===
==== Cleveland Clinic Canada ====
In 2006, the Cleveland Clinic opened Cleveland Clinic Canada, a 26,000-square-foot outpatient clinic in downtown Toronto, offering both Ontario Health Insurance Plan (OHIP) and non-OHIP services. In 2017, Cleveland Clinic Canada acquired the Sports Medicine Specialists located in midtown Toronto.

==== Cleveland Clinic Abu Dhabi ====
An overseas location, Cleveland Clinic Abu Dhabi, opened in 2015.

==== Cleveland Clinic London ====
The organization began work renovating an historic building at 33 Grosvenor Place in central London, England, in 2018. Demolition of the interior of the six-story, 198,000-square-foot building allowed for the conversion to a hospital, with Cleveland Clinic London opening in March 2022.

== Finances ==
In 2011 Cleveland Clinic was second on the Becker's Hospital Review list of top-grossing hospitals in the United States, with total patient revenue of $9.14 billion. The hospital posted $243 million operating income on $8 billion revenue in 2016. Operating income fell about 50% from 2015, which it said was due to shrinking reimbursements and rising drug costs. In 2017 its operating income was $330M on $8.4B in revenue.

In 2015, the Clinic's endowment stood at more than $12 billion. During the coronavirus pandemic, the Cleveland Clinic received a $199 million grant from the United States Department of Health and Human Services under the CARES Act, funding that was intended to prevent health care providers from going under. In 2019, the Cleveland Clinic reported having $7 billion in cash reserves, with investment profits of $1.2 billion.

In addition, Cleveland Clinic plays a significant role in the regional economy of Cleveland and the statewide economy. As of 2019, it is Ohio's largest employer, and generates $17.8 billion for the state.

== See also ==
- List of hospitals in the United States
- Medical centers in the United States
- List of hospitals by capacity
- List of hospitals by staff
