= American Hospital Association =

Health care industry trade group

- Predecessor: The Association of Hospital Superintendents of the United States and Canada
- Established: 1898; 128 years ago
- Type: Professional association
- Headquarters: Chicago, Illinois
- Services: Health care
- Key people: Marc L. Boom, MD (Chair); Richard J. Pollack; (President & CEO)
- Website: aha.org

The American Hospital Association (AHA) is a health care industry trade group. It includes nearly 5,000 hospitals and health care providers.

The organization, which was founded in Cleveland, Ohio in 1898, with offices in Chicago, Illinois, and Washington, D.C. is currently headquartered in Chicago.

The organization has lobbied against Medicare for All proposals and opposed "free care to low-income people who lack medical insurance." It has also filed lawsuits to stop the U.S. government from requiring that hospitals make their prices public, as well as lobbied against various proposals to reduce health care costs for patients and taxpayers.

== History ==
In 1870, there were only about 100 general hospitals in the United States, but the institution was growing rapidly. Hospital administrators formed an organization, The Association of Hospital Superintendents of the United States and Canada, which held its first meeting in 1899 in Cleveland, Ohio, where seven of the eight superintendents in attendance were based.

The organization was promoted by publisher Del Sutton, whose journal, The National Hospital Sanitarium Record, was adopted by the group in 1900, gradually coming under control of the organization until it was replaced by the organization's own publication, The Modern Hospital. Modern Hospital stopped in 1974.

In 1906, the organization adopted its present name. Membership was 450 in 1908. Records of early annual meetings detail some of the conflicts in the emerging hospital culture of Canada and the United States concerning whether hospitals should be governed by physicians or administrators, with non-professionals representing a heavy majority. Current ongoing research into the cost-effectiveness of such a decision has focused on increasing disparities and conflicts of "business ethics and medical ethics" that affect "profitability versus patient and public health care," as administrative overhead makes up a disproportionate amount of health cost.

The organization issued a statement in 1964 backing "service to all people" regardless of "race, religion or national origin."

== Activities ==
=== Conventions ===
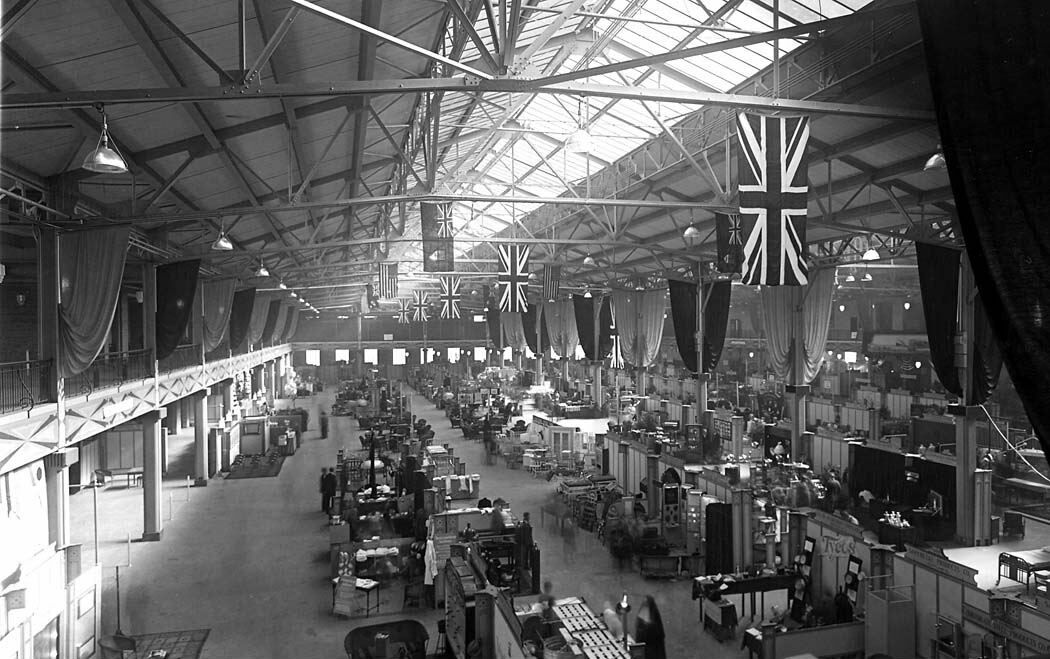
The 1931 convention was held at the Automotive Building in Toronto

AHA, "the country's largest hospital group," held their first annual convention in 1898.

=== Research and data bases ===
In 1946 the AHA began its Annual Survey of US hospitals, building a data base of more than 6,500 hospitals combining more than 1,500 data fields including hospital organizational configuration, healthcare worker data, hospital resources, services provided and financial operations.

In 1951, the association announced it would invest $500,000 (US) in an in-depth study of the financing and overall costs incurred by the nation's hospitals. The study, believed to be the first of its kind, attempted to unearth “…the best ways of offering high quality hospital care at the lowest cost” and included an assessment of the financial status of the nation's hospitals. The study was managed by a commission chaired by Gordon Gray, president of the University of North Carolina.

=== Lobbying ===
The organization has lobbied or been involved in lawsuits on a range of issues:

- lobbied against Medicare for All proposals and opposed "free care to low-income people who lack medical insurance."
- filed lawsuits to stop the U.S. government from requiring that hospitals make their prices public.
- During the coronavirus pandemic, the AHA, American Medical Association and American Nurses Association asked Congress to provide $100 billion in aid to hospitals for coronavirus testing and treatment.
- The AHA sued the Joe Biden administration in 2023 after the HHS restricted the ability of health care providers to sell the data of healthcare website visitors to third-parties on the basis that selling this data constituted HIPAA violation.
- The AHA lobbied against a bipartisan proposal to reduce the costs paid by patients and taxpayers for services at hospitals. The bipartisan proposal would have forced Medicare to pay the same price for the same health care service, whether it is provided in a hospital facility or a doctor's office, rather than pay twice as much for services provided by hospitals.

=== Professional Membership Groups ===
Professional Membership Groups (PMGs) are affiliated societies which fall under the umbrella of the AHA:

- American Society for Healthcare Engineering (ASHE)
- American Society for Healthcare Risk Management (ASHRM)
- Association for Community Health Improvement (ACHI)
- Association for the Healthcare Environment (AHE)
- Association for Healthcare Resource & Materials Management (AHRMM)
- At Large AHA Membership for Healthcare Management/Consulting Professionals
- Society for Healthcare Strategy and Market Development (SHSMD)
- Institute for Diversity and Health Equity

== See also ==
- The Center for Healthcare Governance
- The New York Foundation
- National Uniform Billing Committee
- Federation of American Hospitals
