= Biltmore Forest School =

Historic site in North Carolina, US

- U.S. National Register of Historic Places
- U.S. Historic district
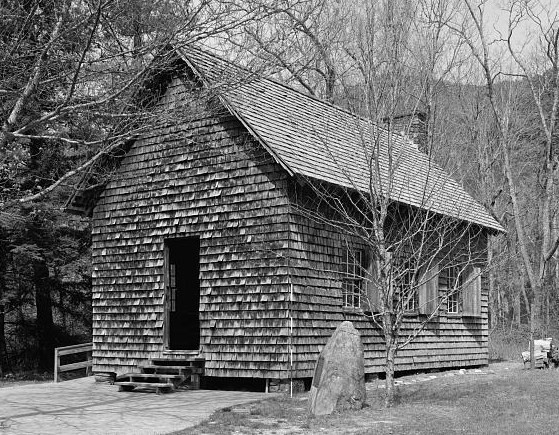
- Biltmore Forest School schoolhouse

- Location within North Carolina Location within the United States
- Nearest city: Brevard, North Carolina
- Coordinates: 35°21′4″N 82°46′52″W
- Built: September 1, 1898
- Architect: Multiple
- Architectural style: rustic
- NRHP reference No.: 74001377
- Added to NRHP: November 19, 1974

The Biltmore Forest School was the first school of forestry in North America. Carl A. Schenck founded this school of "practical forestry" in 1896 on George W. Vanderbilt's Biltmore Estate near Asheville, North Carolina. The school grounds are now part of Pisgah National Forest in Transylvania County, North Carolina, as the Cradle of Forestry in America, a 6,500 acres (2,600 ha) historic site which features exhibits about forestry and forest conservation history.

== History ==
In 1895, George W. Vanderbilt brought Carl A. Schenck from Germany to the Biltmore Estate in western North Carolina to manage the vast expanses of forest lands on the estate's property. Schenck replaced Gifford Pinchot as Vanderbilt's estate forester. He began introducing new scientific management and practical forestry techniques. As Schenck worked throughout Vanderbilt's vast forests, he filled his need for help, in part, by using local young men and other volunteers who were interested in working for free as an apprentice. Because of the growing interest in forestry, Schenck decided to formalize his forestry education program.

With the permission of Vanderbilt, Schenck established the Biltmore Forest School in 1896 using abandoned farm buildings on the estate grounds near Asheville, North Carolina. He taught students in his spare time. According to The Biltmore Company, the school "opened its doors on September 1, 1898." Steven Anderson, president of the Forest History Society, notes this was just a few weeks before the opening of the New York State College of Forestry at Cornell University, making it the first school of forestry in North America.

Although 1898 was the first year the school published a catalog, Schenck operated the school "on a voluntary basis and highly informal" in 1896 and 1897 for a small group of students, including Alfred Gaskill, Edward Merriam Griffith, Frederick E. Olmsted, Overton W. Price, and George H. Wirt. Schenck countered the 1898 opening date, writing, "There was never a formal opening. The first catalog was issued in 1898. … Entrance conditions were lenient—graduation from high school―but once in, strict requirements were enforced. Those who could not make the grades were dropped." The purpose of the school was "to provide foresters for lumber companies." Later, the Biltmore Forest School had so many applicants that Schenck had to create a waiting list.

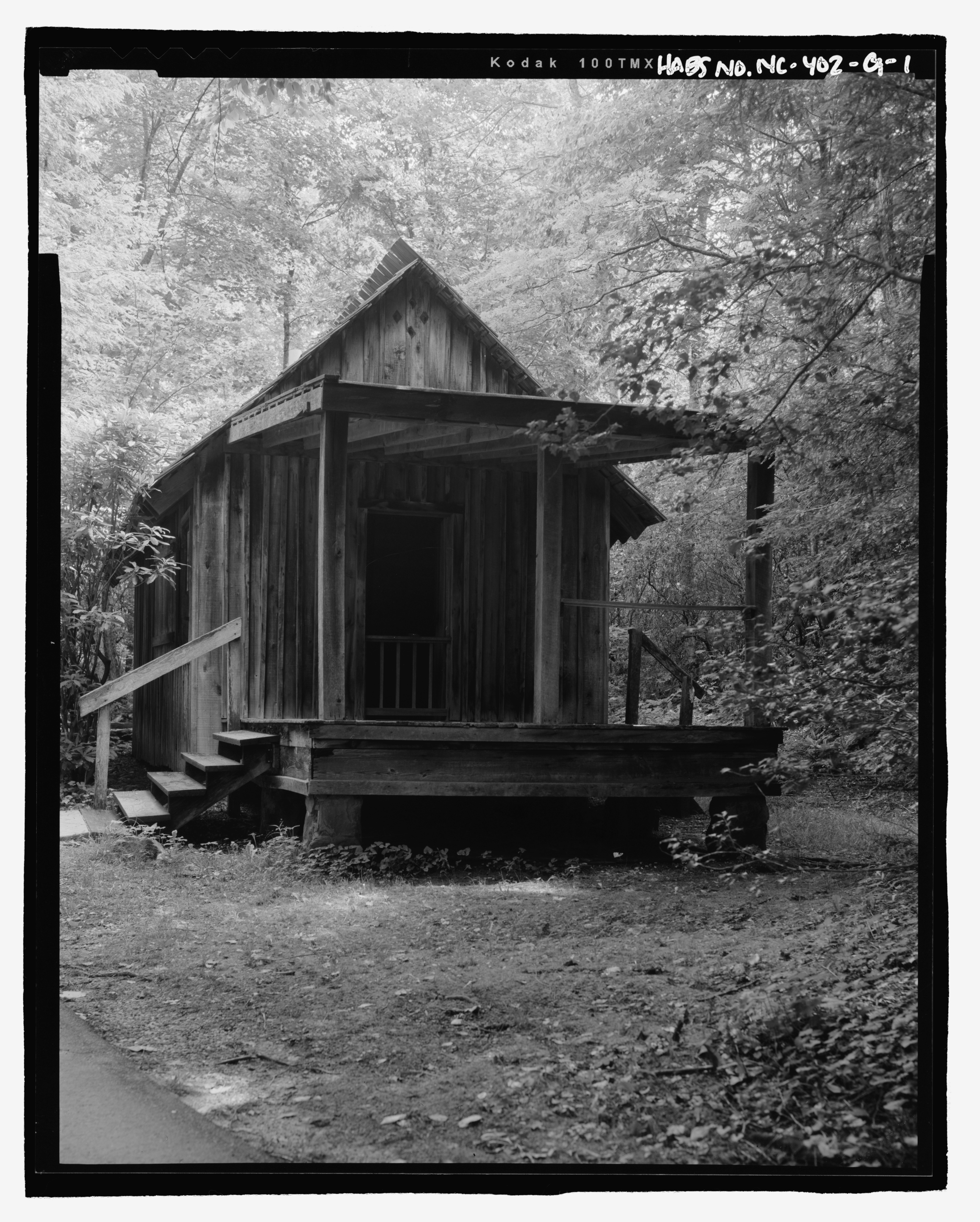
Hell Hole student quarters

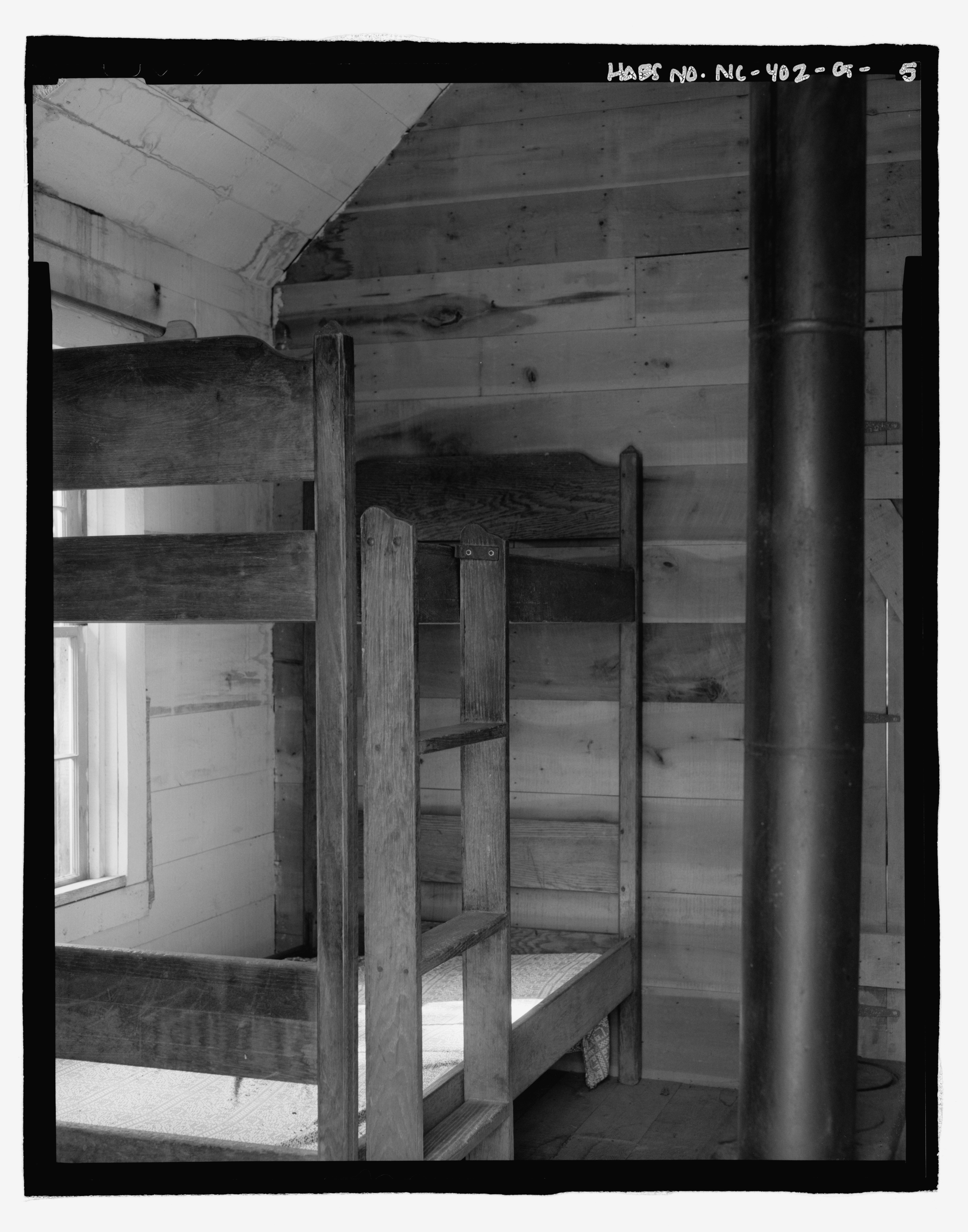
Hell Hole student quarters, interior

The Biltmore Forest School offered a one-year course of study, and the curriculum focused on providing traditional classroom lectures in silvicultural theory supplemented with extensive hands-on, practical forest management field training. The school lacked academic standing and was instead modeled on the German "Master Schools."

Schenck's students spent most afternoons in the forest doing hands-on work and directly applying the theories they had learned in the classroom. One of his former students, Cap Eldridge said, "He just lectured to us three or four hours a day, and the rest of the time we were strung out behind him, traveling full speed while he tended to his duties, which he explained as he went along." This made Biltmore Forest Schools more like the last year of traditional German training and contrasts strongly with the newly formed American college programs which took place indoors.

Schenck proudly said, “My boys worked continuously in the woods, while those at other schools saw wood only on their desks.” The students learned felling, logging, sawing, operating machinery, transplanting seedlings, and caring for tree nurseries. In addition, their studies included botany, dendrology, fish and game, and forest economics. Schenck also took students with him on his annual vacation to Europe.

However, student residences were less than desirable; students were told to "find yourself a place to stay" amongst the abandoned farmhouses and cabins in the area. When the students were at their summer camp at Pink Beds in Transylvania County, five of the buildings they lived in were called Hell Hole, Little Bohemia, Little Hell Hole, The Palace, and Rest for the Wicked. Some students were lucky and found a place to stay with the rangers. Despite this, tuition for the school was expensive at $200 a year, meaning that its students mostly came from wealthier families. In contrast, tuition was $175 a year for Harvard University in the same year. By 1906, the school's brochure indicated that a year at Biltmore Forest School cost closer to $750, with a horse, food, boarding, travel, and the $200 in tuition. During a national financial crisis, Schenck was forced to raise tuition to $250, and again in January 1909, to $300.

Geographically, the school's students came mostly from the South and Midwest. Many were the children of lumbermen who wanted to increase profits in their family business. However, there were also students from the Northeast who were interested in conservation. These students tended to be from upper-middle-class families and lack a background in forestry or lumber. Regardless of background, the graduates of the Biltmore Forest School were hired into the new United States Division of Forestry which was under the leadership of Biltmore Estate's former forester, Pinchot. This mutually beneficial relationship was short-lived; Pinchot helped establish the forestry school at Yale University with a $150,000 endowment from his father. These students were being taught Pinchot's view of forestry and were, therefore, more likely to be hired by him.

After a disagreement with Schenck in 1903, Pinchot wrote Vanderbilt requesting that he end Schenck's ability to award a master's degree and that he also close the Biltmore Forest School altogether. Schenck responded with a measured five-page letter noting the professional accomplishments of the Biltmore Forest School's graduates, including those who worked for Pinchot at the Forest Service. He also stated that none of his students had failed the Forest Service exam. In addition to noting that Pinchot's request would unfairly benefit Yale University, he also wrote:

"As regards to my personal knowledge of forestry, I can only say that no forester in the United States had a better chance of training than myself; that no forester in the United States is held in higher esteem by Sir Dietrich Brandis and Dr. William Schlich than myself; that no forester in the United States has ever passed his university examinations more satisfactorily than myself; that no forester in Hesse Darmstadt has ever reached a higher standing in the government examinations than myself; and that no forester obtained the doctor degree ‘summa cum laude’ excepting myself. I do not want to talk of these matters boastingly. I just want to emphasize that my forestal knowledge is, to say the least, equal to Filibert Roth, Henry Graves, or Mr. Fisher, the young sapling who now occupies the chair of forestry at Harvard."

By 1904, their differences seemed to have resolved; Pinchot again hired Biltmore Forest School graduates and also sent federal foresters to lecture at the school. Balancing increasing numbers of students and his obligations to the estate, Schenck added more students and used their tuition to hire faculty. Dr. Clifton. D. Howe and, later, Dr. Homer D. House joined the faculty, serving as assistants to Schenck and teaching forestry and botany. Like Schenck, Howe had also studied with Sir Dietrich Brandis. Other faculty throughout the school's fifteen years included H. O. Allison (farming), Edgar D. Broadhurst (principals of law), Clement Samuel Brimley (zoology), George Lemon Clothier (prairie planting), Collier Cobb (geology and mineralogy), F. D. Couden (entomology), Dr. Bernhard E. Fernow (forestery), Dr. Andrew D. Hopkins (entomology), R. S. Kellogg (American forest statistics), Frederick Haynes Newell (irrigation), Dr. Harry C. Oberholzer (zoology), Malcolm Ross (farming), Franklin Sherman (zoology), Dr. St. George L. Sioussat (principals of economics), Dr. Hermann von Schrenk (fungus diseases), and Dr. Raphael Zon (activities of the National Forestry Service).

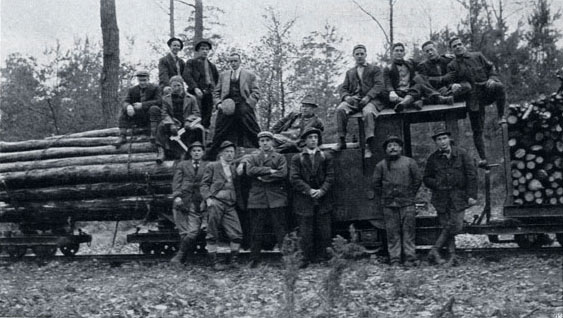
Students inspecting a forest rail line, Darmstadt, Germany, circa 1912

In 1908, Schenck had a heated disagreement with Vanderbilt who wanted to sell off part of the estates' forests to ease his financial crisis. In addition, Vanderbilt disagreed with some of Schenck's strategies to raise money for the estate. In 1909, Schenck quarreled with Charles Beadle, head of Biltmore Estate's nurseries, resulting in a criminal charge for assault. Vanderbilt asked Schenck to resign in April 1909, with Schenck working to the end of his contract in November 1909.

Although the Biltmore Forest School was financially self-sustaining, Schenck could no longer operate it on Vanderbilt's property. His students and alumni unsuccessfully tried to raise the funds to purchase Pisgah Forest from Vanderbilt. The school continued to operate by using a variety of locations. It was based at the logging village of Sunburst in Haywood County which was owned by Champion Paper and Fibre Company for a time, with the company providing classroom space and student housing. Students spent winters in Darmstadt, Germany, and Mimizan-les-Bains, France, and the rest of the year in forests in upstate New York; North Carolina; Cadillac, Michigan; and Coos Bay, Oregon. In 1910, Schenck tried to take his students on a tour of the pine plantations on Biltmore Estate—because they were barred at the door, they jumped a fence in an isolated spot.

House estimated that there were 300 graduates from Biltmore Forest School; 100 entered the field of forestry. However, there may have been as many as 350 students. The school closed in 1913. Schenck noted, "It could not compete with the many state schools of forestry which had by then been set up." In addition, Biltmore Forest School "lacked support from lumbermen."

In 1914, Schenck was called back to Germany for World War I. Although he lectured in both Europe and the United States after the war, he did not try to reestablish his forestry school. He wrote, “Retrospectively, let me assert that the Biltmore Forest School died at the right time. It died when it had reached the apex of its career. Be it man or tree or institution, it is better to die too early than too late.”

== Biltmore Forest Fair ==
In November 1908, Schenck hosted the Biltmore Forest Fair which was designed to "demonstrate the accomplishments and possibilities of scientific management and practical forestry techniques." The fair also recognized the tenth anniversary of Biltmore Forest School and the twentieth anniversary of private forestry at Biltmore. Schenck wrote personal letters to nearly 400 people, inviting them to attend the fair. Along with these letters of invitation, he enclosed a 55-page illustrated booklet, A Forest Fair in the Biltmore Forest, which provided information about the forest and conservation. The 50 to 100 attendees included botanists, foresters, furniture manufacturers, lumbermen, and university professors.

The three-day festival ran from November 26–29, exhibiting forestry practices taught at the school and providing lessons in logging operations, planting techniques, seed regeneration, and soil composition. Schenck guided attendees on forest plantation tours. Guests also toured Biltmore Estate's nurseries. The fair showcased Schenck's forestry and conservation practices and resulted in various newspaper articles. American Lumberman magazine wrote that the festival was the beginning of a new “epic in American forestry.”

== Legacy ==
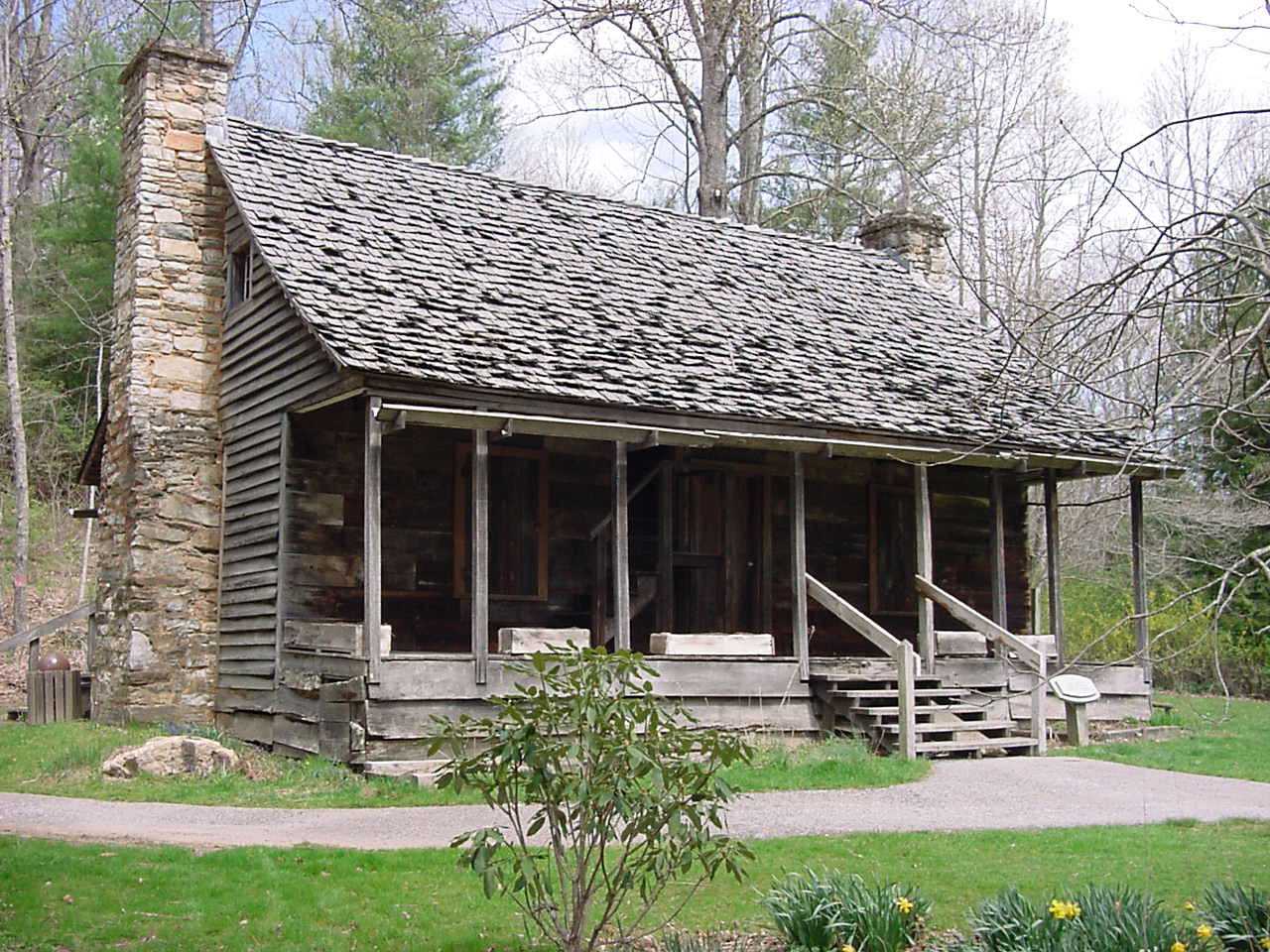
First Ranger's House on exhibit at the Cradle of Forestry.

Despite the school's short existence, it laid the foundation for American forestry education. Schenck's theories of sustainable forestry greatly influenced the field, remaining important long after he died in 1955. Graduates of the Biltmore Forest School became the first generation of American professional foresters. Instructor Homer D. House estimated that 25 of its students became well known in American forestry.

The Biltmore Forest School's first reunion was in Wilmington, Delaware, after World War I. This was followed by several reunions in New York City, the last one taking place in the 1930s In May 1950, the alumni of Biltmore Forest School had a reunion at the George Vanderbilt Hotel in Asheville, North Carolina. They toured Schenck's pine plantations on the Biltmore Estate, had a barbecue at Pink Beds and held an event at Lake Logan clubhouse of the Champion Paper and Fibre Company. They also placed a commemorative tablet called "The Plymouth Rock of Forestry" at the site of the former schoolhouse and planted three pine trees in memory of Schenck. The plaque reads: “In memory of Carl Alwin Schenck, 1867-1955. This memorial forest is dedicated to honor a great teacher and founder of the Biltmore Forest School, the first school of forestry in the New World. His ashes have been spread here among the trees he loved." The event drew 36 alumni from seventeen states. Dr. Hans Schenck, Schenck's nephew from Germany, brought hand-carved reunion emblems for each alumnus.

Today, the school continues to be celebrated as the Cradle of Forestry in America heritage site on Vanderbilt's former lands in Pisgah National Forest in Transylvania County, North Carolina. The Cradle of Forestry in America was dedicated on October 20, 1964. The 6,500 acres (2,600 ha) historic site includes the Forest Discovery Center, an indoor forestry and forest conservation history museum, gift shop, and café. There are two guided trails that include several of the school's original buildings, a 1914 Climax logging locomotive, and a portable sawmill. The center offers special programs, crafts demonstrations, nature education programs, and special events.

Biltmore Hall, home of the College of Natural Resources at North Carolina State University, was named in honor of the school. Schenck considered the forestry program there the successor to the Biltmore School.

Released in 2015, the Emmy Award–winning film America’s First Forest: Carl Schenck and the Asheville Experiment tells the story of Schenck and his work at Biltmore.

== Notable alumni ==
- Swift Berry (1907)
- Joseph S. Illick (1913)
- Frederick E. Olmsted (1897)

== Notable faculty ==
- Clement Samuel Brimley
- Bernhard E. Fernow
- Andrew D. Hopkins
- Homer D. House
- C. D. Howe
- Frederick Haynes Newell
- Harry C. Oberholzer
- Carl A. Schenck
- Raphael Zon

== See also ==
- Carl A. Schenck
- List of historic schools of forestry
