= Association for Community Health Improvement =

American public health organization

The Association for Community Health Improvement (or ACHI) is a professional organization that promotes community health, benefit, living healthy, and general public health. Founded in 2002, it is an affiliate of the American Hospital Association.

== History ==
The Association for Community Health Improvement was conceived in 2002 as a successor to three national community health initiatives: the Community Care Network Demonstration Program, ACT National Outcomes Network, and Coalition for Healthier Cities and Communities. These three programs have made contributions to community health starting in the mid 1990s, focusing on topics including health care delivery and preventive health systems, careful planning for and measurement of progress toward defined community health goals, and broad community engagement in resolving systemic challenges to community health and social well-being.

ACHI has over 700 members from 47 states, the District of Columbia, and Canada.

== See also ==
- American Hospital Association
