= Cleveland Clinic Journal of Medicine =

- Discipline: General medicine
- Language: English
- Edited by: Brian Mandell
- Former names: Cleveland Clinic Quarterly; Cleveland Clinic Bulletin

Standard abbreviations
- ISO 4: Clevel. Clin. J. Med.
- NLM: Cleve Clin J Med

Indexing
- CODEN: CCJMEL
- ISSN: 0891-1150 (print); 1939-2869 (web)
- LCCN: 87640278
- OCLC no.: 14576751

Links
- Journal homepage

The Cleveland Clinic Journal of Medicine (CCJM) is a peer-reviewed medical journal published by the Cleveland Clinic. It covers internal medicine, endocrinology, and diabetes. The editor-in-chief is Brian Mandell.

First released as the Cleveland Clinic Bulletin in 1931, the publication was renamed the Cleveland Clinic Quarterly in 1932 and later rebranded as the CCJM in 1987.

CCJM is a peer-reviewed medical publication distributed monthly to over 123,000 healthcare professionals, including internists, hospitalists, cardiologists, endocrinologists, diabetologists and pulmonologists.

The journals is indexed in the Journal Citation Reports.
