= Frederick E. Olmsted =

American forester (1872–1925)

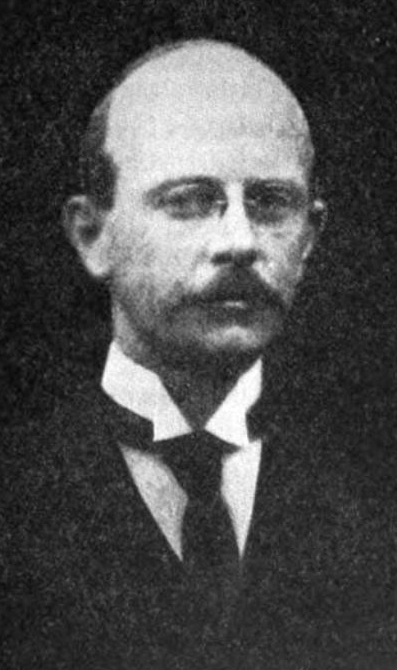
- Born: Frederick Erskine Olmsted; November 8, 1872; Hartford, Connecticut, U.S.
- Died: February 19, 1925 (aged 52); Palo Alto, California, U.S.
- Resting place: Cedar Hill Cemetery
- Other name: Fritz Olmsted
- Education: Yale University; Biltmore Forest School; Harvard University; Ludwig-Maximilians-Universität München
- Occupation: forester
- Employer(s): United States Forest Service; Fisher, Bryant, and Olmsted; Diamond Match Company
- Known for: National Forests, one of the founders of American forestry
- Board member of: Society of American Foresters
- Children: Frederick Olmsted Jr.

Frederick Erskine Olmsted, also known as Fritz Olmsted, (November 8, 1872 – February 19, 1925) was an American forester and one of the founders of American forestry. Through his work with the United States Forest Service, Olmsted helped establish the national forest system in the United States and helped train the next generation of Forest Service agents and college professors. He was instrumental in the creation of at least twenty national forests in California and Alaska including the Muir Woods National Monument and Tongass National Forest. He also wrote the Use of National Forest Resources (1905, 1907), a foundational Forest Service manual that laid the groundwork for the nation's enduring forest management system, elements of which remain in use today.

After leaving the Forest Service, Olmsted taught at Harvard University. He also worked as a consulting forester with practices in Boston and California. His most important consultations resulted in fire management plans for the Canadian railways and for Mount Tamalpais in California. Olmsted was a founder and president of the Society of American Foresters.

Fritz Olmsted was the nephew of Frederick Law Olmsted, the influential landscape designer, and first cousin to landscape designers Frederick Law Olmsted Jr. and John Charles Olmsted. He initially trained in forestry at the Biltmore Forest School, an educational outgrowth of his uncle's suggestions for Biltmore Estate. His son, Frederick Olmsted Jr. is noted as an artist with the Federal Art Project and the Public Works of Art Project.

== Early life and education ==
Olmsted was born in Hartford, Connecticut, on November 8, 1872. He was the son of Lucy Sawyer Hollister (born 1848) and Albert Harry Olmsted (1842–1929), a banker. His father was a half-brother of acclaimed landscape designer Frederick Law Olmsted and uncle to Frederick Law Olmsted Jr. and John Charles Olmsted.

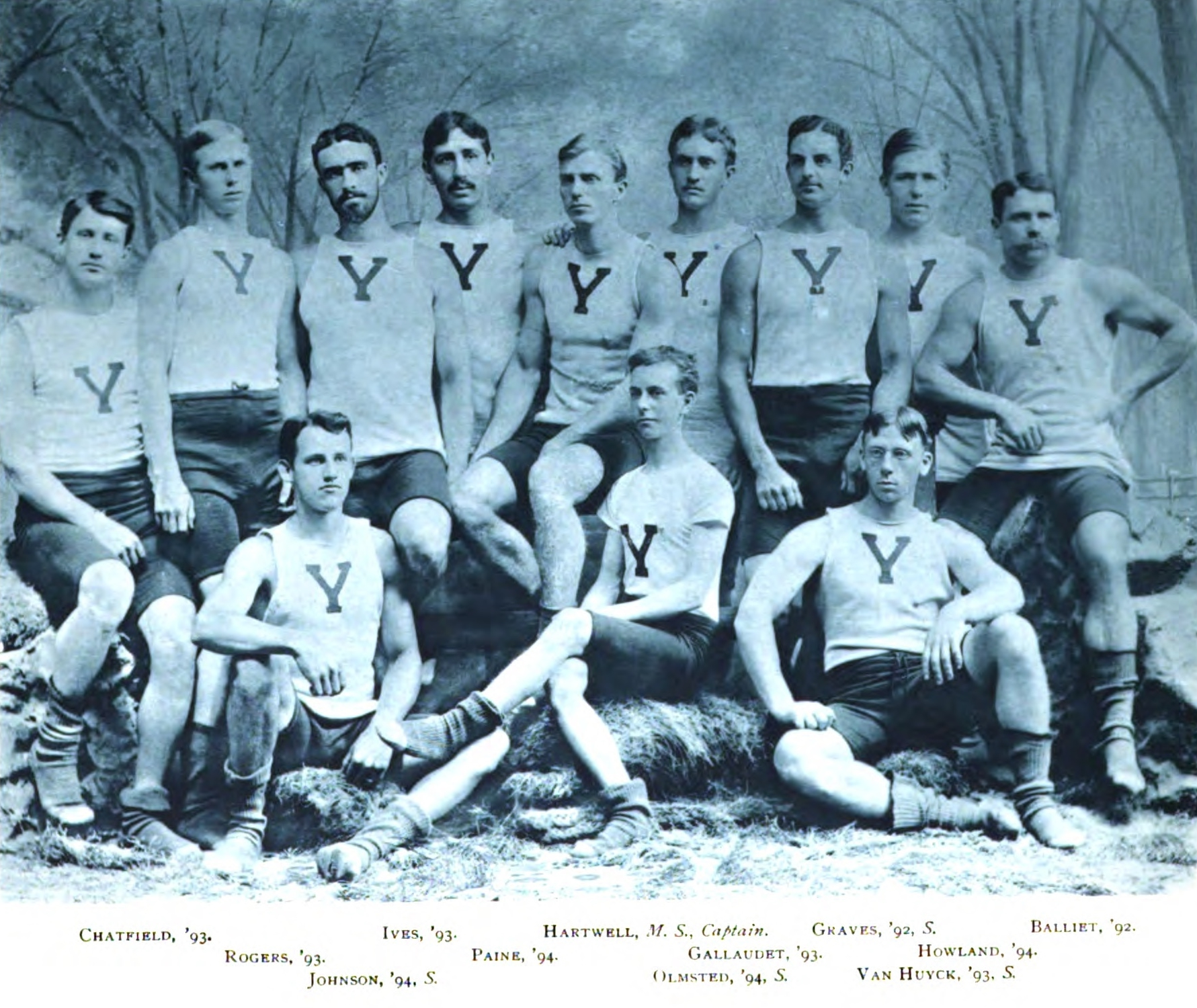
Yale University varsity crew team 1892. Olmsted is in the middle of the front row.

Olmsted went to Hartford Public High School, graduating in 1891. He then attended Yale University where he studied civil engineering, graduating from the Sheffield Scientific School with a Bachelor of Philosophy (Ph.B.) in 1894. While there, he was a member of the Fraternity of Delta Psi (St. Anthony Hall) and a member of the committee that selected the winner of the senior class cup. He was also the coxswain of the Yale Bulldogs' varsity crew team in 1882, 1883 and 1884.

After working for two years and receiving an introduction to forestry at the Biltmore Forest School, Olmsted returned to college, attending graduate school at Harvard University in 1897 and 1898. In the fall of 1897, he took courses at the University of Cambridge and Arnold Arboretum.

Starting in the spring of 1898, Olmsted spent a year working and studying with foresters in the Black Forest in Baden, Germany. He studied forestry under Dietrich Brandis at the Ludwig-Maximilians-Universität München, receiving a diploma in 1899. In November 1899, at the suggestion of Brandis, he studied practical forestry in the foothills of the Himalayas in India where most of the forests were under state control. He returned to the United States in 1900.

== Career ==
=== Banking ===
After graduating from Yale, Olmsted worked for a year at George P. Bissell & Company, his father's bank in Hartford, Connecticut. Although George P. Bissell & Company was the oldest private banking house in New England, the firm went into a receivership in 1896.

=== Geological survey and forestry ===
In 1896, Olmsted joined the topographic mapping division of the United States Geological Survey (USGS) at the suggestion of his first cousin, Frederick Law Olmsted Jr. (Note: Frederick Law Olmsted Jr. and Fritz Olmsted both graduated from Yale in 1894, but the former had previously apprenticed under his father at Biltmore Estate in Asheville, North Carolina. Since Fritz worked for the U.S. Geological Survey near Asheville, presumably his cousin's job suggestion was for the Asheville-Pisgah Quadrangle team rather than the U.S.G.S. in general.) He spent eighteen months near Asheville, North Carolina, surveying and building trails and roads, as well as re-surveying the USGS Pisgah Quadrangle map. While there, he met Dr. Carl A. Schenck, forester of the Biltmore Estate, and learned about career opportunities of the new field of forestry. He left the USGS and worked for Schenck for a few months while attending the earliest incarnation of the Biltmore Forest School, which was founded by Schenck in 1896.

=== Division of Forestry ===
On July 1, 1900, Olmsted was hired as an assistant forester by Gifford Pinchot, who headed the newly established Division of Forestry of the United States Department of Agriculture (now the United States Forest Service). Pinchot was also a Yale University graduate and had previously worked with the forests at Biltmore Estate, where he was hired at the suggestion of Olmsted's uncle Frederick Law Olmsted. Olmsted became a "boundary boy" for the Division of Forestry, locating the boundaries of the governmental forest reserves. He typically spent the winters in Washington, D.C., working in the field during the season.

Pinchot placed Olmsted in charge of the Subdivision of Forest Products in 1902 because, he said, Olmsted "was one of the most capable, experienced, and mature men of the office." From 1902 to 1905, Olmsted supervised fifteen "boundary boys" in the newly created Boundary Division of the Bureau of Forestry and was charged with locating any remaining western public timber lands for inclusion in a reservation for management. This process laid the foundation for the modern national forest system.

Pinchot also asked Olmsted to rewrite the unpopular Forest Reserve Manual prepared by the Forest Service's predecessor, the General Land Office Division of Forestry. Olmsted's assignment was to create a "policy blueprint" that defined the forest reserves and their use, described the role of forestry service officers, and detailed how to address public claims and permits. The Forest Service issued this new Use of National Forest Resources (commonly known as the Use Book) in July 1905 and a revision in June 1907. It was not only an instructional book, with goals and regulations for Forest Service employees, but also one of the first administrative manuals for the United States government. Olmsted changed the tone of the book, characterizing the Forest Service positively as an agency "willing to consider use under certain conditions".

Olmsted became the California chief inspector in 1905 and the first district forester of District 5 in late 1908, working out of an office in the Merchants Exchange Building in San Francisco. District 5 included the national forests in California and western Nevada. In a history of the U.S. Forest Service, Anthony Godfrey notes that during this era, "the district forester was likened to being an 'autonomous king' and overlord of a domain—controlled only by laws broadly interpreted and by general policy." Olmsted had a passion for his work and a gift for supervising his team, which included Coert DuBois (Olmsted's brother-in-law), R. L. Frome, John H. Hatton, William G. Hodge, G. M. Homans, E. A. Lane, George B. Lull, George W. Peavey, and C. S. Smith.

Although he had specific assignments such as surveying boundaries, tracking the size of timber sales, and submitting annual grazing statistics, Olmsted had total authority over staff and use of the district's money and supervised a team of around 140 district rangers and their supervisors. In this capacity, he developed a field inspection system that was implemented throughout the Forest Service. Godfrey notes that Olmsted's team also sought to save the "West from itself through public forestry and with the West's consent and support, to break the monopoly and favor the little man." They had to settle issues with the Homestead Forest Act which was passed by the United States Congress on June 11, 1906. This Act required the Forest Service to review all lands to determine if they were better suited for agriculture than forestry, opening those that were for homesteading. As a result, there was a land rush and the District 5 offices received some 12,000 applications for 1,144,359 acres (463,106 ha) of homesteading land—processing the applications and overseeing the program took a significant amount of time away from their main focus of forestry. In addition to legal residents of the forest, Olmsted and his team also had to deal with illegal squatters within the national forests. However, the main job of District 5 was timber management.

In 1907, Olmsted presided over a meeting of forest supervisors in Yreka, Siskiyou County, California. That same year, businessman and congressman William Kent wrote a letter to Pinchot and Olmsted about his efforts to donate 211 acres (85 ha) known as Muir Woods to the United States. He had been told there was not a way for the government to accept this gift. Olmsted visited the site and wrote a letter to the United States Secretary of the Interior requesting that Muir Woods become a national monument under the Antiquities Act. President Theodore Roosevelt declared it Muir Woods National Monument on January 9, 1908. Olmsted is credited as being vital to its establishment because of his creativity in interpreting United States laws and regulations. Other sites receiving National Forest status under Olmsted's oversight include Angeles National Forest, Calaveras Big Tree National Forest, Cleveland National Forest, Eldorado National Forest, Inyo National Forest, Kern National Forest, Klamath National Forest, Lassen National Forest, Modoc National Forest, Mono National Forest, Monterey National Forest, Plumas National Forest, Santa Barbara National Forest, Sequoia National Forest, Shasta National Forest, Sierra National Forest, Stanislaus National Forest, Tahoe National Forest, and Trinity National Forest.

In 1907, Olmsted was the first professional forester to conduct a detailed examination of Southeast Alaska's forests, resulting in his recommendation to create the Tongass National Forest.

In 1909, Olmsted served on a three-person committee to develop a plan for California's highway trees. However, in January 1910, President William Howard Taft fired and replaced Pinchot as head of the Forest Service following the Pinchot–Ballinger controversy. Olmsted was stunned by the loss of his mentor. That year was also the worst fire season in the United States since the creation of the Forest Service, burning 2,500,000 acres (1,000,000 ha) of national forests, but only 330,000 acres (130,000 ha) in the 278 forest fires in Olmsted's district. Olmsted noted, "If one-hundredth of the damage from fire this past summer had occurred in any German state, the whole forest force would have been promptly dismissed." In December 1910, Olmsted convened a five-day meeting of District 5's supervisors, where, though he never explicitly mentioned Pinchot by name, he began with a review of Pinchot's philosophy regarding the timber lands of the West. Olmsted's meeting covered all of District 5's programs, including fire protection, grazing, reforestation, timber sales, wildlife, and work plans, as well as his belief in a decentralized decision-making process. Because of this meeting, all forest supervisors were required to submit a forest protection plan and there were increases in the number of California's forest guards.

=== Fisher, Bryant and Olmsted ===
In June 1911, Olmsted announced his resignation from the Forest Service, effective July 1, 1911. He said he wanted to return to the forest and leave the administrative offices behind; he may also have missed working with Pinchot. He became a consulting forester with the firm Fisher & Bryant, along with Richard Thornton Fisher and Edward S. Bryant who were both graduates of Harvard University. Renamed Fisher, Bryant and Olmsted, their offices were at 141 Milk Street in Boston, Massachusetts. Olmsted left the firm by early 1913 for an opportunity in California but maintained a professional relationship with the renamed Fisher and Bryant, Inc. Bryant left the firm in April 1914 to become an inspector for the United States forest service.

=== Harvard University ===
In the spring semester of 1913, Olmsted taught forestry at Harvard University. That same year, Harvard and Yale University had both lost most of their historic elms to damage caused by the gypsy moth, the leopard moth, and the brown-tail moth. It was estimated that it would take 50 to 100 years before the campus trees were restored. Olmsted noted that the universities neglected their historic trees because "a feeling was evident that the elms had always been there and always would be in spite of various setbacks."

=== Consulting forester ===
In the fall of 1913, Olmsted moved back to California, working as a consulting forester out of San Francisco from 1913 to 1914 and Sausalito from 1914 to 1915. He created regulations to prevent fires on the Canadian railways.

In August 1913, he was hired by the Tamalpais Fire Association to develop a plan to protect Mount Tamalpais and the surrounding area of Marin County from fires. At Olmsted's request, legislation was submitted and adopted by the California legislature that established the Tamalpais Forest Fire District, the first formally incorporated mountain fire district in the state. His plan called for the construction of trails and fire breaks, as well as the addition of a warden and a telephone system. Olmsted oversaw this work, reporting that two fire trails that were 1 mile (1.6 km) long and 15 feet (4.6 m) wide had been completed by February 1914. Clearing the land to create the firebreaks cost thirteen cents per square yard or $116 per mile. Other work on the project included trimming brush, clearing debris from existing trails and firebreaks, and burning brush that had been cut by the U.S. Army the prior year.

He also organized the Tamalpais Fire Protection Association. Olmsted was elected secretary of the Tamalpais Association in November 1915. He also supervised the association's rangers for three years as its head patrolman, before stepping down in March 1917.

During World War I, Olmsted again worked for the Forest Service. He spent six months determining which lumber production was essential or nonessential. In 1917, he moved his consulting forester office to Palo Alto, California, where he conducted inspections of logging operations to improve efficiency and future land productivity. His offices were in the new University Reality Company building on the corner of University Avenue and Bryant Street. As a consultant, he also created topographic maps and logging plans, appraised timber, estimated timber yields, and developed systems to prevent fires.

In late 1921, Olmsted and Pinchot collaborated to create legislation for the national forest. Olmsted wanted Congress to pass the Capper Bill, giving the U.S. Forest Service the ability to regulate forest devastation. Olmsted stated that lumbermen, who owned the majority of timber lands in the United States, were causing a scarcity of forest resources with improper cutting techniques that discouraged regrowth. He believed volunteer forest regrowth was superior to hand planting, stating that "artificial planting is too costly and is never resorted to unless a satisfactory volunteer growth can not be procured." Thus, he supported federal government regulation of timbering on privately owned lands.

Around the same time, the Diamond Match Company hired Olmsted "to introduce and supervise conservative cutting on its California holdings". He worked for them until he retired in 1923.

== Professional affiliations ==
Olmsted was a founder of the Society of American Foresters (SAF). He served as the SAF president from 1919 to 1921 and supported federal oversight of private cutting.

== Personal life ==
Olmsted married Florence Starbuck DuBois on September 13, 1909. She was the daughter of Evelina Patterson Kimball and Dr. John C. DuBois, a graduate of Yale University. They had two sons, Frederick Olmsted Jr. and Julian Olmsted. Another child, DuBois Olmsted, died in infancy. His son Frederick was an artist with the Federal Art Project and the Public Works of Art Project.

In 1911, the family moved to Boston, Massachusetts. They moved back to California in 1913. In 1917, Olmsted hired architect Henry Higby Gutterson to design a shingle style house for his family at 773 Dolores Street on the campus of Stanford University. The family moved there in 1918. The relationship between Olmsted and Stanford University is unknown, although he did correspond with the university's president David Star Jordan from 1912 to 1919. It is possible that Olmsted helped plan and plant Stanford University Arboretum as a consulting forester. His uncle, Frederick Law Olmsted had created the master plan for the campus in 1888, but work had ended on the arboretum in 1891 before it was completed.

Olmsted was a member of the Century Club in Washington, D.C., serving on its board of governors and as chairman of the committee of literature and art. He was also a non-resident member of the Cosmos Club. In addition, he was a member of Park Congregational Church in Hartford, Connecticut.

In 1925, Olmsted died from liver cancer at his Dolores Street home in Palo Alto, California. His funeral held on February 16 and was private. He was cremated at Cypress Hill Crematorium in San Francisco and buried in Cedar Hill Cemetery in Hartford, Connecticut.

== Selected publications ==
- "A Working Plan for Forest Lands near Pine Bluff, Arkansas". U.S. Department of Agriculture, Bureau of Forestry Bulletin No. 32, 1902.
- "Tests on the Physical Properties of Timber".Yearbook of the United States Department of Agriculture, 1902
- Report on a Preliminary Examination of the Forest of the U.S. Military Academy, West Point, NY, 1903, OCLC 1289022678
- Forestry of the U.S.M.S. Reservation: Letter from Mr. Gifford Pinchot; Report by Mr. F. E. Olmstead, Bureau of Forestry. West Point, NY: U.S.M.A. Press 1903. OCLC 71067191
- Use of the National Forest Reserves: Regulations and Instructions. Washington, D.C.: Forest Service, U.S. Department of Agriculture, 1905.
- The Use of National Forests. Washington, D.C.: Forest Service, U.S. States Department of Agriculture, June 14, 1907.
- "Forest Conditions of California and Suggestions for their Improvement." Transactions of the Commonwealth Club of California, vol. 4, 1909, pp. 78–82.
- "Fire and the Forest – The Theory of 'Light Burning'". Sierra Club Bulletin, January 1911, pp. 42–47
- "How Forestry Uses Fire: Practical Work on the California National Forests." Sunset vol. 27, September 1911, pp. 276–81, OCLC 71067100
- Light Burning in California Forests. U.S. Department of Agriculture, Forestry Service. Washington, D.C.: U.S. Printing Office, 1911,
- Mt. Tamalpais and Vicinity (Map). California: Mount Tamalpais Fire Association, 1915.
- "The Lumberman's Duty Toward Forestry.'" Proceedings of the Society of American Foresters. vol. 1, no. 1, January 1916. pp. 79–83.
- "Activities of the Society of American Foresters." Journal of Forestry vol. 17, 1917. pp. 663–665.
- Map of Proposed Humboldt Redwoods State Park. California, 1929, OCLC 26651200
