= American Heart Journal =

Peer-reviewed medical journal

- Discipline: Cardiology
- Language: English
- Edited by: D.B. Mark

Publication details
- History: 1925–present
- Publisher: Elsevier
- Frequency: Monthly
- Impact factor: 5.099 (2021)

Standard abbreviations
- ISO 4: Am. Heart J.

Indexing
- CODEN: AHJOA2
- ISSN: 0002-8703 (print); 1097-6744 (web)
- LCCN: a38001186
- OCLC no.: 643470889

Links
- Journal homepage; Journal page at publisher's website; Online archive

The American Heart Journal is a monthly peer-reviewed medical journal covering all aspects of cardiology. It is published by Elsevier and the editor-in-chief is Daniel B. Mark (Durham, NC). The journal was established in 1925 and published bimonthly until 1977, when it switched to a monthly schedule.

== Abstracting and indexing ==
The journal is abstracted and indexed in Scopus, Science Citation Index, Current Contents/Clinical Medicine, Current Contents/Life Sciences, BIOSIS Previews, and Index Medicus/MEDLINE/PubMed. According to the Journal Citation Reports, the journal has a 2021 impact factor of 5.099, ranking it 45th out of 336 journals in the category "Cardiac & Cardiovascular Systems".
