= The Modern Hospital =

Defunct print publication

The Modern Hospital (published 1913 to 1974) was a journal founded by Otho Ball, "an ophthalmologist who was interested in the business administration of hospitals."

They published year books, and their Gold Medal was given as recognition of "a significant contribution to the literature of hospitals and hospital service."

Their publisher, McGraw Hill Publications, closed the magazine in 1974.

== Reporting ==
The magazine wrote about new hospitals and conditions in existing ones. Smithsonian magazine wrote about Modern Hospital's 1942 coverage of proposed windowless hospital rooms: "in the 1940s it was a shocking proposal" since it violated "a fundamental assumption: In order to remain disease-free and health-giving, hospital spaces required direct access to sunlight and fresh air."

One of their features was "hospital of the month".

== Competition ==
Among competing periodicals of the magazine's era were:

- Hospital Management
- The Trained Nurse and Hospital Review, a nursing journal
- Modern Nursing Home
- Public Health Nursing
