= National Uniform Billing Committee =

US governing body for medical codes

- Abbreviation: NUBC
- Founded: 1975; 51 years ago
- Type: governing body
- Headquarters: Chicago, Illinois, U.S.
- Coordinates: 41.884771°N 87.636661°W
- Members: 19
- Chair: Terrence Cunningham
- Parent organization: American Hospital Association
- Website: www.nubc.org

The National Uniform Billing Committee (NUBC) is the governing body for forms and codes use in medical claims billing in the United States for institutional providers like hospitals, nursing homes, hospice, home health agencies, and other providers. The NUBC was formed by the American Hospital Association (AHA) in 1975. All the major national provider and payer organizations participate in discussions and decisions on policy and guidelines.

In 1982, after much work and debate, the UB-82 emerged as the endorsed national uniform bill. After an 8-year moratorium on change, the UB-82 was replaced by UB-92, and became the standard for billing paper institutional medical claims in the United States, until creation of the UB-04. With the onset of HIPAA and the transition to electronic claims submission for reimbursement, NUBC has become the steward of the related data specifications for medical claims coding on electronic institutional claims.
