= George P. Burdell =

Fictitious student in Georgia Tech

George P. Burdell is a fictitious student officially enrolled at Georgia Tech in 1927 as a practical joke. Since then, as part of the joke, he received all undergraduate degrees offered by Georgia Tech, served in the military, gotten married, and has served on Mad Magazine's Board of Directors, among other accomplishments.

At one point, Burdell led the online poll for Time's 2001 Person of the Year award. Burdell has become a longstanding tradition at Georgia Tech, where students learn about the fictional character during orientation.

== History ==
=== Origins ===
George P. Burdell was created by William Edgar "Ed" Smith (BS in Ceramic Engineering) in 1927. Smith conceived the idea for Burdell when he mistakenly received two Georgia Tech enrollment forms. Fifty years later, in a 1977 Atlanta newspaper interview, Smith said that he originally intended to enroll his Academy of Richmond County principal, George P. Butler, but instead changed the last name to Burdell, the maiden name of his best friend's mother.

After enrolling him, Smith signed Burdell up for all the same classes he had. With the help of friends, Smith would do all schoolwork twice, changing it slightly to avoid professors catching his sham. When he had a test, he would take it twice and then turn it in under both names. By 1930, the school had awarded Burdell a bachelor's degree, and a few years later awarded the fictitious student a master's degree. The college listed him as an official alumnus, even though his name has remained on the active student rolls. In 1930, the ANAK Society, Georgia Tech's oldest secret society, offered Burdell membership.

An early prank using Burdell's name came after someone was snubbed by a fraternity he had intended to join. "That irritated [him]. He ordered a truckload of furniture to be delivered C.O.D. to that fraternity. Of course, the order was made by George P. Burdell."

=== World War II ===
During World War II, service members continued the hoax, with Burdell's name appearing on various fronts. For example, he was listed on the flight crew of a B-17 bomber, flying 12 missions over Europe with the 8th Air Force in England, until a Georgia Tech graduate became the new operations officer, recognized the name on the flight log, and ended the charade.

=== Postwar ===
In 1958, members of the senior class of Agnes Scott College announced the wedding engagement of Burdell and fictional Agnes Scott student Ramona Cartwright in the Atlanta Journal-Constitution. The 50th wedding anniversary of "Mr. and Mrs. George P. Burdell from Atlanta" was acknowledged on the September 23, 2006 broadcast of A Prairie Home Companion. A recording can be found at a time of 1:13:55.

To this day, George P. Burdell is listed as a letterman in the official media guides of two Tech sports: from 1928 to 1930 in football and 1956 to 1958 in basketball. In 1969, Georgia Tech computerized its class registration, believing it had successfully found a way to keep students from registering Burdell for class that semester. As it turned out, hackers registered him for every class at the school that quarter, over 3,000 credit hours. He was subsequently re-enrolled several times, including in 1975 and 1980.

George P. Burdell is listed as Georgia Tech Swimming & Diving's team captain of 1988 on their record board, even though there was no team that year after the demolition of the Heisman Gym.

The publishers of Mad magazine listed Burdell as a member of its board of directors from 1969 until 1981. In 1991, a check from Kraft Foods bore the signature "George P. Burdell". When Time magazine was attempting to select their Person of the Year for 2001, Burdell was the leading candidate (holding at least 57 percent of the votes) until the magazine removed him from the running.

WREK, the Georgia Tech student radio station, lists him as a staff member, and he is credited for playing baritone on the 1995 album Jesus Christ Superstar: A Resurrection, which was made in Atlanta by musicians from the local alternative rock scene. In 2000, Burdell was named an alternate delegate to the Democratic National Convention from Georgia. Burdell was credited as a member of the choir of the 2006 album There is a Place.

George's fictitious son, George P. Burdell Jr., has been a proctor for several classes at Georgia Tech.

=== Modern era ===
With the introduction of Georgia Tech Online Master of Science in Computer Science in 2013, George P. Burdell has been a presence in its social media, with students attempting to stake a claim of his legacy in Reddit.

On November 27, 2014, George P. Burdell allegedly hacked into the University of Georgia's online master calendar to post a new event titled "Get Ass Kicked by GT" during the time of the annual Georgia Tech football game. This prank was meant to celebrate the 100-year-old tradition of Clean, Old-Fashioned Hate. While the author of the new calendar event was marked as Burdell, undergraduate Computer Engineering student Ryan Pickren was ultimately arrested and indicted for the crime.

During a speech made by US President Barack Obama held at Georgia Tech in the McCamish Pavilion on March 10, 2015, the president jokingly indicated that he was supposed to be introduced by George P. Burdell, but no one could find him.

On June 25, 2019, George P. Burdell's name flew engraved on the Prox-1 satellite mission designed and built by the Guggenheim School of Aerospace Engineering at Georgia Tech. His name is listed along with all the other students who worked on the mission. The satellite was part of the Space Test Program 2 (STP-2) launch on a SpaceX Falcon Heavy Rocket.

== Legacy ==
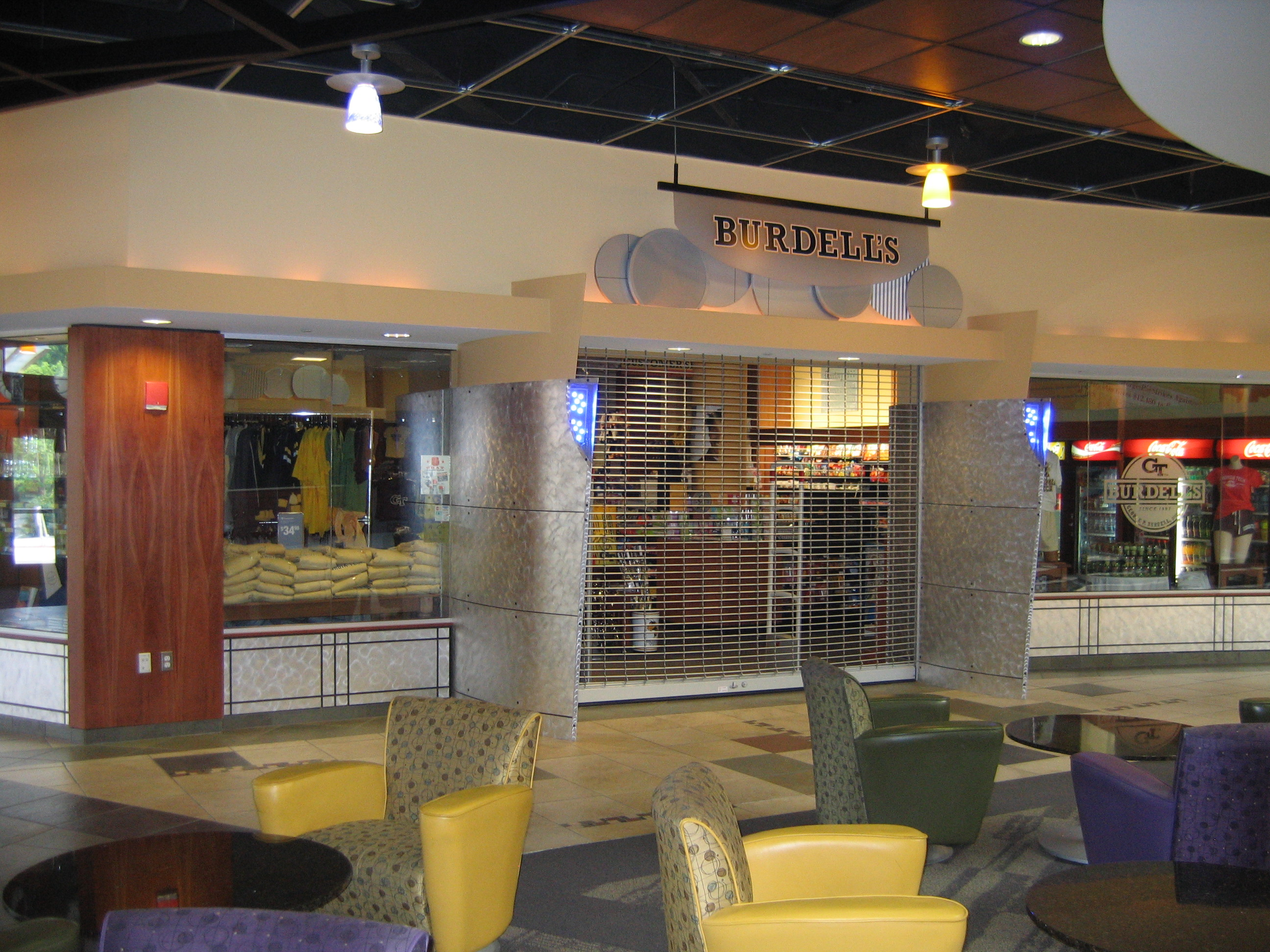
Burdell's, a store in Georgia Tech's student center.

Burdell has been a campus icon at Georgia Tech. Georgia Tech students or alumni have often used the name as an alias when they do not want to disclose their real name. In 2006, a store in Georgia Tech's student center was named Burdell's.

== See also ==
- List of fictitious people
- Eustace B. Nifkin, fictional student of the SUNY College of Environmental Science and Forestry
- Josiah S. Carberry, fictional professor at Brown University
- Jakob Maria Mierscheid, fictional politician in the German Bundestag
