= SUNY-ESF Ranger School =

Forestry school in New York, US

Coordinates: 44.146588°N 74.90115°W

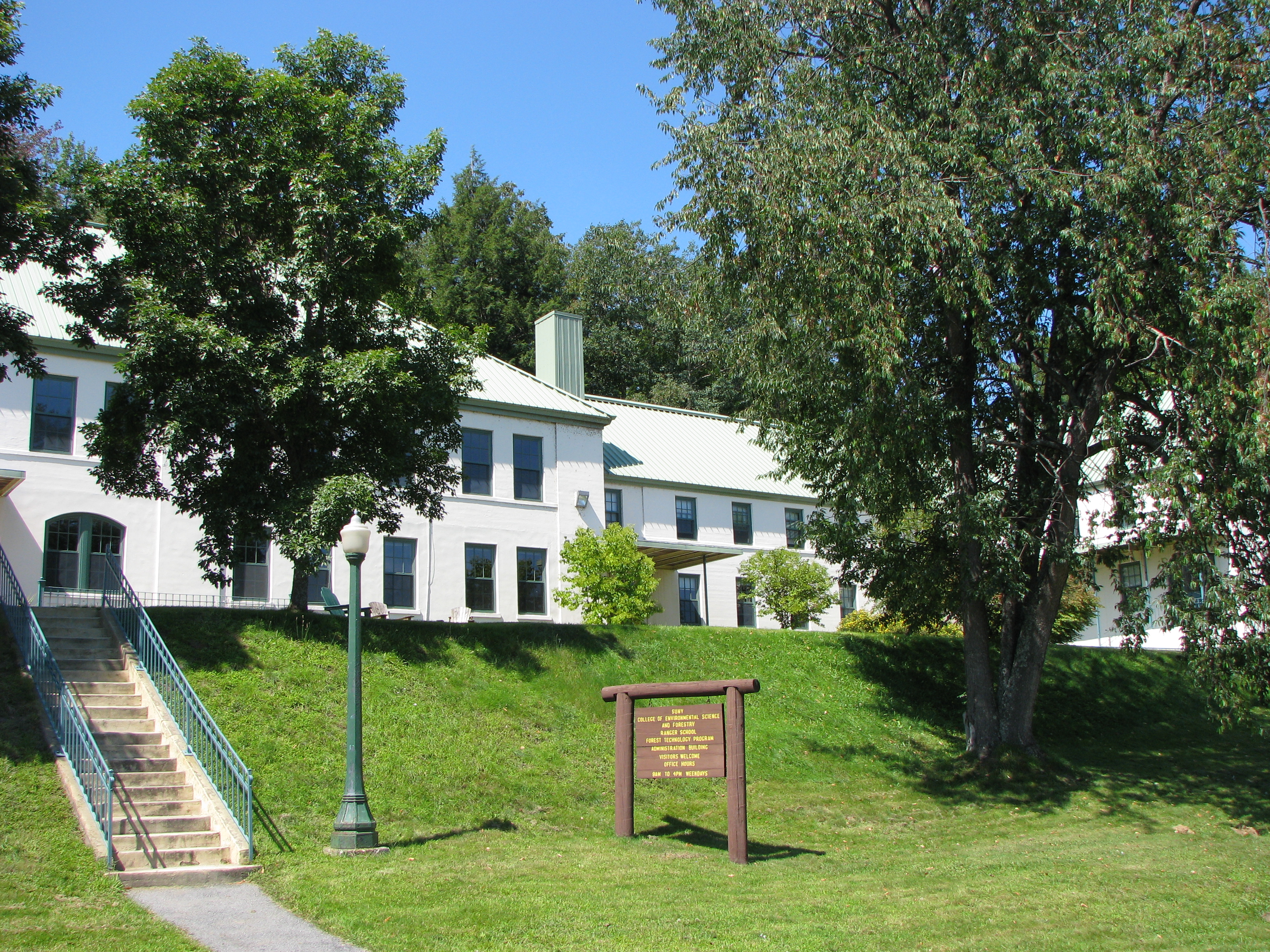
- Type: Public
- Established: 1912
- Director: Mariann Garrison-Johnston
- Location: Wanakena, New York, U.S.
- Campus: Rural
- Mascot: Mighty Oaks
- Website: esf.edu/rangerschool

The SUNY ESF Ranger School (formerly the New York State Ranger School), on the east branch of the Oswegatchie River near Wanakena, New York, offers A.A.S. degrees in Forest Technology, Land Surveying Technology, and Environmental and Natural Resources Conservation. Established in 1912, the school is affiliated with the State University of New York College of Environmental Science and Forestry (SUNY ESF). The Ranger School commemorated its centennial in 2012–13.

== Location ==
The Ranger School is situated in the northwestern part of the Adirondack Park, on the east branch of the scenic Oswegatchie River, which flows into Cranberry Lake. The campus is about 65 miles (105 km) from Watertown, New York, and 35 miles (56 km) from Tupper Lake.

== History ==
The New York State Ranger School was founded in 1912, under the administration of the New York State College of Forestry at Syracuse University, to train forest rangers and other personnel for the still-young Adirondack Park. Eugene S. Whitmore, the Ranger School's first graduate, completed his studies the same year that school was founded, in 1912. More than 3000 students have completed their degrees at the Ranger School since it opened. The Ranger School celebrated its centennial anniversary in 2012–13.

=== Leadership ===
- Professor James F. Dubuar served as Director of the Ranger School for 37 years, from 1921–1957.
- The current director is Mariann Johnston.

=== Properties ===
- Shortly before its establishment, the school received a gift of 1,800 acres (7.3 km^{2}) from the Rich Brothers Lumber Company.
- In 1923, Governor Alfred E. Smith, later to become President of the Board of Trustees of the New York State College of Forestry, signed an appropriation bill for the construction of the Ranger School's new building; the structure was dedicated in 1928.
- The International Paper Company added to the school's properties with a gift of 500 acres (2.0 km^{2}), in 1929.

== Today ==
Today the Ranger School is a unit of SUNY ESF. Mariann Johnston, Professor of Forest and Natural Resources Management, is director.

After "spending a year at a college of their choice," students spend an academic year or summer at the residential school, studying forest technology, land surveying technology, or environmental and natural resources conservation, earning an Associate of Applied Science (A.A.S.) degree upon completion. Students can continue their studies at the main ESF campus, in Syracuse, to earn a bachelor's degree.

In addition to classrooms, offices, dormitory and kitchen facilities, the school's properties also include the 3,000-acre (12 km^{2}), James F. Dubuar Memorial Forest.

Programs at the SUNY ESF Ranger School now qualify for the SUNY Reconnect program.These programs include Land Surveying Technology and Environmental and Natural Resources Conservation.
