= State University of New York College of Environmental Science and Forestry =

Doctoral research institution in Syracuse, New York, US

Coordinates: 43.034793°N 76.135475°W

- Motto: "Improve Your World"
- Type: Public university
- Established: July 28, 1911; 115 years ago
- Parent institution: State University of New York (formerly Syracuse University)
- President: Joanne M. Mahoney
- Provost: Lindi Quackenbush
- Academic staff: 139 full-time 37 part-time
- Students: 2,227 (fall 2025)
- Undergraduates: 1,860 (fall 2025)
- Postgraduates: 367 (fall 2025)
- Location: Syracuse, New York, U.S.
- Campus: Urban and rural, 25,000 acres (10,000 ha)
- Colors: Green, white & gold
- Nicknames: Mighty Oaks, Stumpies
- Sporting affiliations: USCAA (HVIAC)
- Mascot: Oakie the Acorn
- Website: esf.edu

The State University of New York College of Environmental Science and Forestry (ESF) is a public research university in Syracuse, New York, United States focused on the environment and natural resources. It is part of the State University of New York (SUNY) system. ESF is immediately adjacent to Syracuse University, within which it was founded, and with which it maintains a special relationship - students take classes at other SU colleges, graduate together, share common student life (except NCAA sports participation), and until 2011 lived exclusively in SU housing. ESF is classified as a "Mixed Baccalaureate" institution, with an "R2: High Research Spending and Doctorate Production" designation. ESF operates education and research facilities also in the Adirondack Park (including the Ranger School in Wanakena), the Thousand Islands, elsewhere in Central New York, and Costa Rica. The college's curricula focus on the understanding, management, and sustainability of the environment and natural resources.

== History ==
=== Founding ===
The New York State College of Forestry at Syracuse University was established on July 28, 1911, through a bill signed by New York Governor John Alden Dix. The previous year, Governor Charles Hughes had vetoed a bill authorizing such a college. Both bills followed the state's defunding in 1903 of the New York State College of Forestry at Cornell University. Originally a unit of Syracuse University, in 1913, the college was made a separate, legal entity.

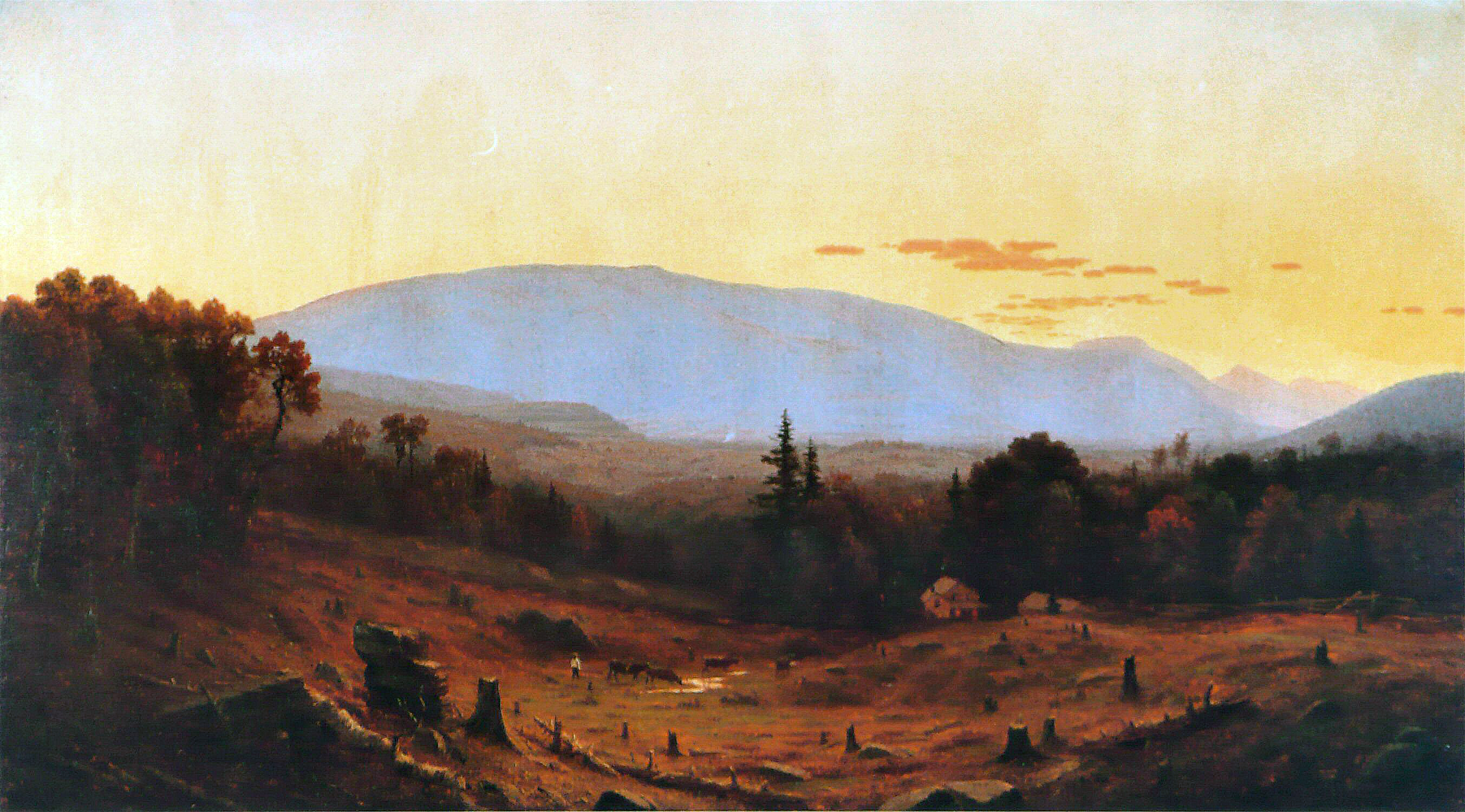
Hunter Mountain, Twilight (1866) by Hudson River School artist Sanford Robinson Gifford, showing the devastation wrought by years of tanbarking and logging.

Syracuse native and constitutional lawyer Louis Marshall, with a summer residence at Knollwood Club on Saranac Lake and a prime mover for the establishment of the Adirondack and Catskill Forest Preserve (New York), became a Syracuse University Trustee in 1910. He confided in Chancellor James R. Day his desire to have an agricultural and forestry school at the university, and by 1911 his efforts resulted in a New York State bill to fund the project: the aforementioned appropriation bill signed by Governor Dix. Marshall was elected president of the college's board of trustees at its first meeting, in 1911; at the time of his death, eighteen years later, he was still president of the board.

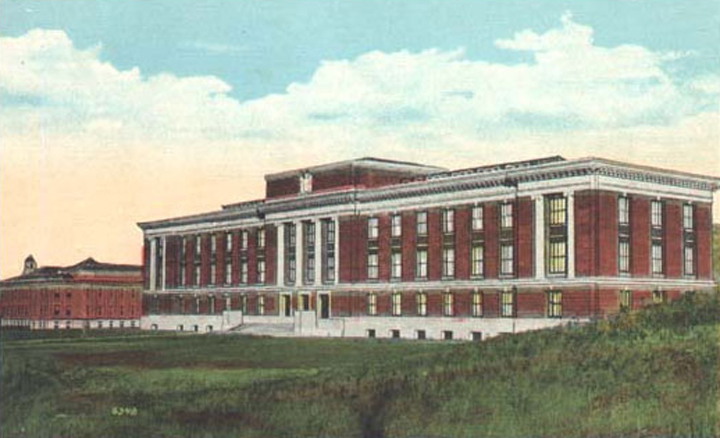
Syracuse University, College of Forestry (Bray Hall)

The first dean of the college was William L. Bray, a Ph.D., graduate from the University of Chicago, botanist, plant ecologist, biogeographer and Professor of Botany at Syracuse University. In 1907 he was made head of the botany department at Syracuse, and in 1908 he started teaching a forestry course in the basement of Lyman Hall. Bray was an associate of Gifford Pinchot, who was the first Chief of the United States Forest Service. In 1911, in addition to assuming the deanship of forestry, Bray organized the Agricultural Division at Syracuse University. He remained at Syracuse until 1943 as chair of botany and Dean of the Syracuse Graduate School.

In 1915, the same year that Dr. Bray published The Development of the Vegetation of New York State, he became one of the founding members, along with Raphael Zon and Yale School of Forestry's second dean, James W. Toumey, of the Ecological Society of America. In 1950, the 1917 "activist wing" of that Society formed today's The Nature Conservancy.

Most of the professors in the early years of the College of Forestry at Syracuse and the Department of Forestry at Cornell's New York State College of Agriculture were educated in forestry at the Yale School of Forestry. The forestry students at Syracuse but not at Cornell were referred to as "stumpies" by their classmates.

Fifty-two students were enrolled in the school's first year, the first 11 graduating two years later, in 1913. Research at the college commenced in 1912, with a study of New York state firms using lumber, including from which tree species and in what quantities.

=== Expansion ===
In 1912, the college opened its Ranger School in Wanakena, New York, in the Adirondacks. The college began enrolling women as early as 1915, but the first women to complete their degrees—one majoring in landscape engineering and two in pulp and paper—graduated in the late 1940s. The Ranger School did not enroll any women until 1973–74.

In January 1930, Governor Franklin D. Roosevelt, recommending an allocation of $600,000 towards construction of the college's second building, in honor of Louis Marshall, recently deceased, noted that: "under [Marshall's] leadership and the leadership of its late dean, Franklin Moon, the School of Forestry made giant strides until it became recognized as the premier institution of its kind in the United States". The cornerstone of Louis Marshall Memorial Hall was laid in 1931 by former Governor and presidential candidate Alfred E. Smith who was elected to assume the presidency of the college's board of trustees.

=== Affiliation with SUNY ===
With the formation of the State University of New York (SUNY) in 1948, the college became recognized as a specialized college within the SUNY system, and its name was changed to State University College of Forestry at Syracuse University. In 1972, the college's name was changed yet again to State University of New York College of Environmental Science and Forestry. Unlike other state-supported degree-granting institutions which had been created at private institutions in New York State, the New York State College of Forestry at Syracuse University was an autonomous institution not administratively part of Syracuse University. In 2000, SUNY System Administration established ESF's "primacy" among the 64 SUNY campuses and contract colleges for development of new undergraduate degree programs in Environmental Science and Environmental Studies.

== Campuses ==
=== Syracuse ===
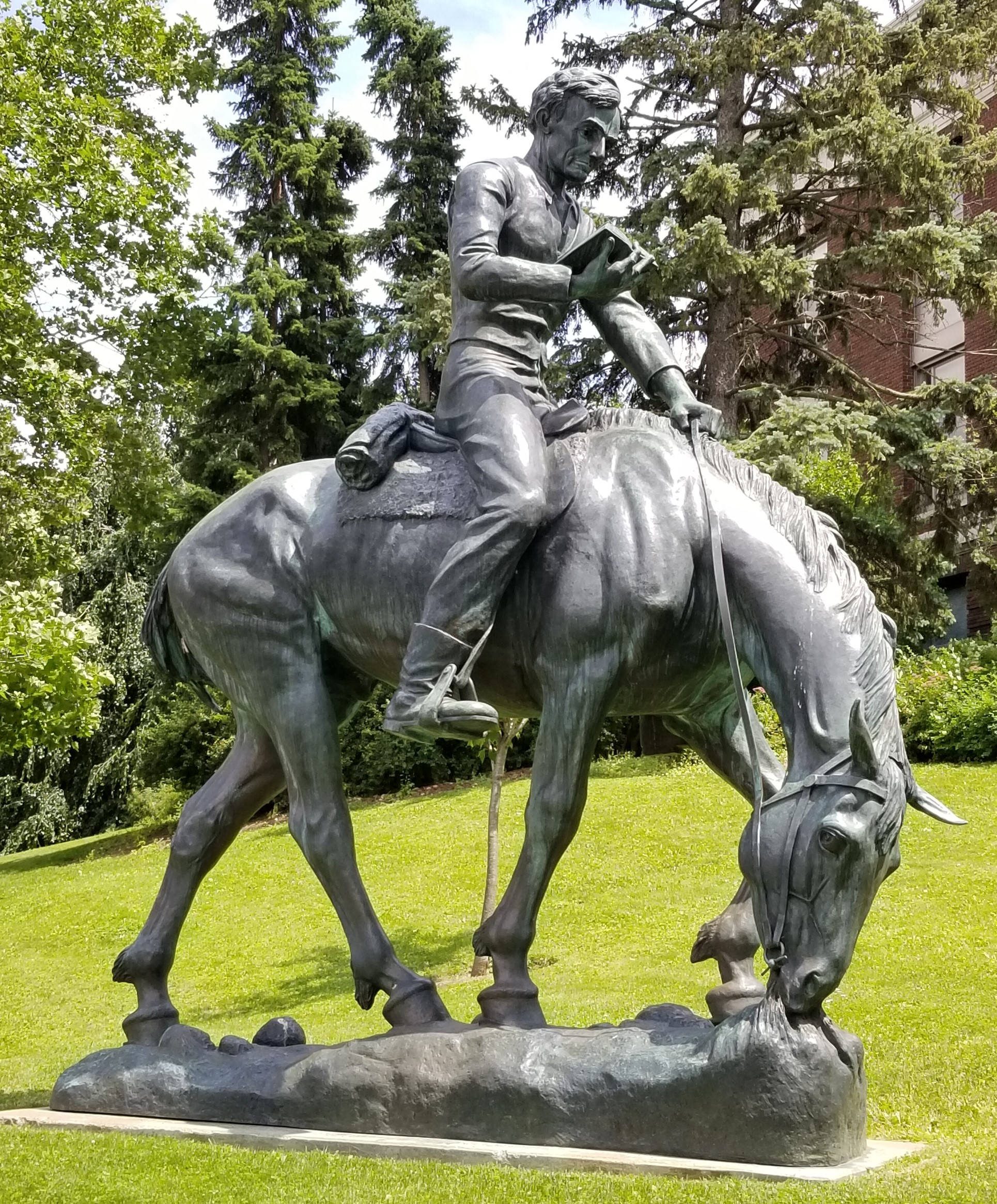
"Young Abe Lincoln on Horseback", sculpture by Anna Hyatt Huntington, on the ESF campus

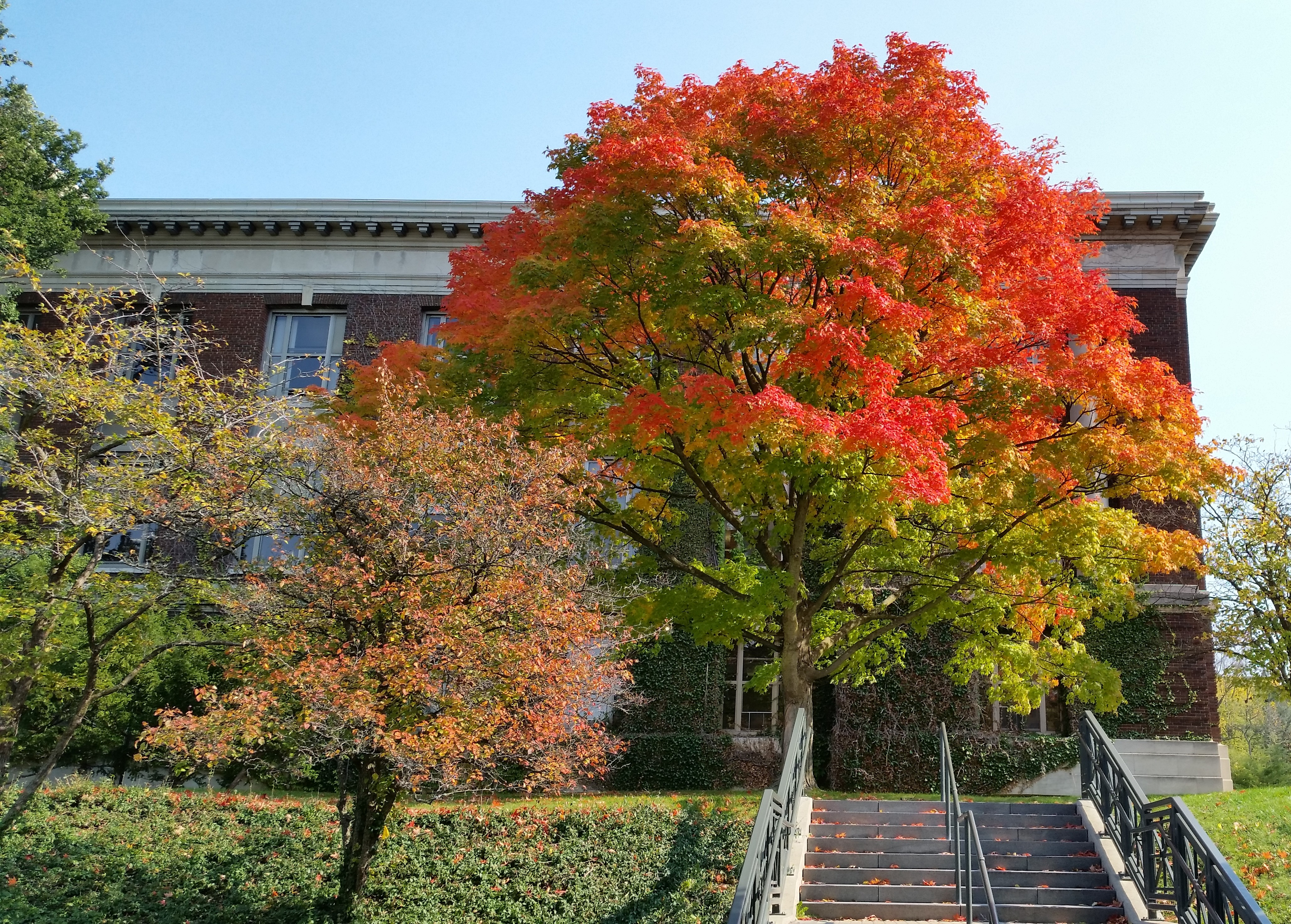
Autumn colors, Bray Hall

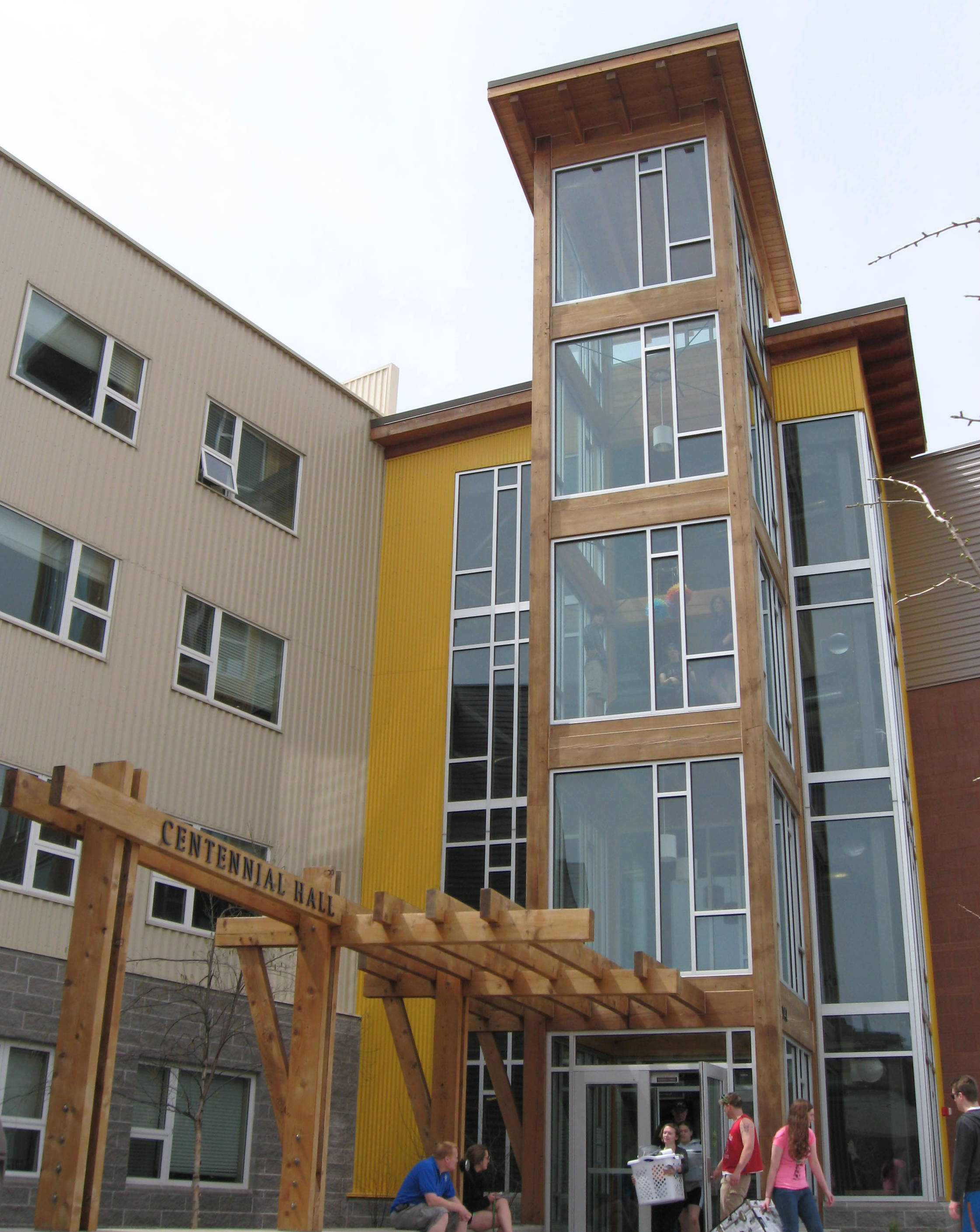
Centennial Hall

ESF's main campus, in Syracuse, New York, is where most academic, administrative, and student activity takes place. The campus is made up of nine main buildings:

- Baker Laboratory: Named after Hugh P. Baker, dean of the college from 1912 to 1920 and again 1930–33. The building is the location of several computer clusters and auditorium-style classrooms. It is home to the Department of Environmental Resources Engineering and the Division of Environmental Science. The building underwent a $37 million overhaul in the early 2000s, providing updated space for the Tropical Timber Information Center and the Nelson C. Brown Center for Ultrastructure Studies. Baker Lab is the site of ESF's NASA-affiliated Research Center. Baker Laboratory houses two multimedia lecture halls, a "smart" classroom outfitted for computer use and distance learning, and two construction management and planning studios. It also has a full-scale laboratory for materials science testing, including a modern dry kiln, a wood identification laboratory, shop facilities (including portable sawmill) and wood preservation laboratory.
- Bray Hall: The building is the oldest on campus, completed in 1917, the largest building devoted to Forestry at the time. It is named after William L. Bray, a founder of the New York State College of Forestry at Syracuse University and its first dean, 1911–1912. It is the location of most administrative offices and the Department of Sustainable Resources Management. The State University Police department is in the basement.
- Gateway Center: The campus' newest building, opened in March 2013, "sets a new standard for LEED buildings, producing more renewable energy than it consumes," according to Cornelius B. Murphy, Jr. The building is "designed to achieve LEED Platinum Certification". The ESF College Bookstore, Trailhead Cafe, and Office of Admissions are in the Gateway Center.
- Illick Hall: The building was completed in 1968, and is home to the Department of Environmental Biology. It is named after Joseph S. Illick, a dean of the State University College of Forestry at Syracuse University. There is a large lecture hall (Illick 5) on the ground floor. Several greenhouses are on the fifth floor. The Roosevelt Wildlife Museum is also in the building.
- Jahn Laboratory: Named after Edwin C. Jahn, former head of the New York State College of Forestry at Syracuse University. The building was completed in 1997. Home to the Department of Chemistry.
- Marshall Hall: Named after Louis Marshall, one of the founders of the New York State College of Forestry at Syracuse University. The Alumni (Nifkin) Lounge and Marshall Auditorium are within. Twin brass plaques commemorate the contributions of Marshall and his son, alumnus Bob Marshall. Home of the Department of Environmental Studies, the Department of Landscape Architecture, and the Division of General Education.
- Moon Library: Dedicated to F. Franklin Moon, an early dean of the college. Completed in 1968, along with Illick Hall. A computer cluster and student lounge are in the basement.
- Walters Hall: Named after J. Henry Walters, who served on the college's board of trustees. Completed in 1969. Home to the Department of Chemical Engineering. The pilot plant in the building includes two paper machines and wood-to-ethanol processing equipment.
- Centennial Hall: ESF's on-campus student dormitory, commemorating the college's 100th anniversary. The residences are capable of accommodating 280–300 freshman (in double or triple studio rooms with private bath), 116 upperclassmen (in single bedroom suites with private bath), and an additional 56 upperclassmen (in 4-bedroom, 2-bath apartments). A $31 million project, Centennial Hall opened in 2011.

Bray Hall, Marshall Hall, Illick Hall, and Moon Library border the quad. Other buildings on the Syracuse campus include one for maintenance and operations, a garage, and a greenhouse converted to office space. Among planned new buildings is a research support facility.

The historic Robin Hood Oak (photo below) is behind Bray Hall. The tree is said to have grown from an acorn brought back by a faculty member from the Sherwood Forest in England. It was the first tree listed on the National Registrar of Historic Trees in the United States.

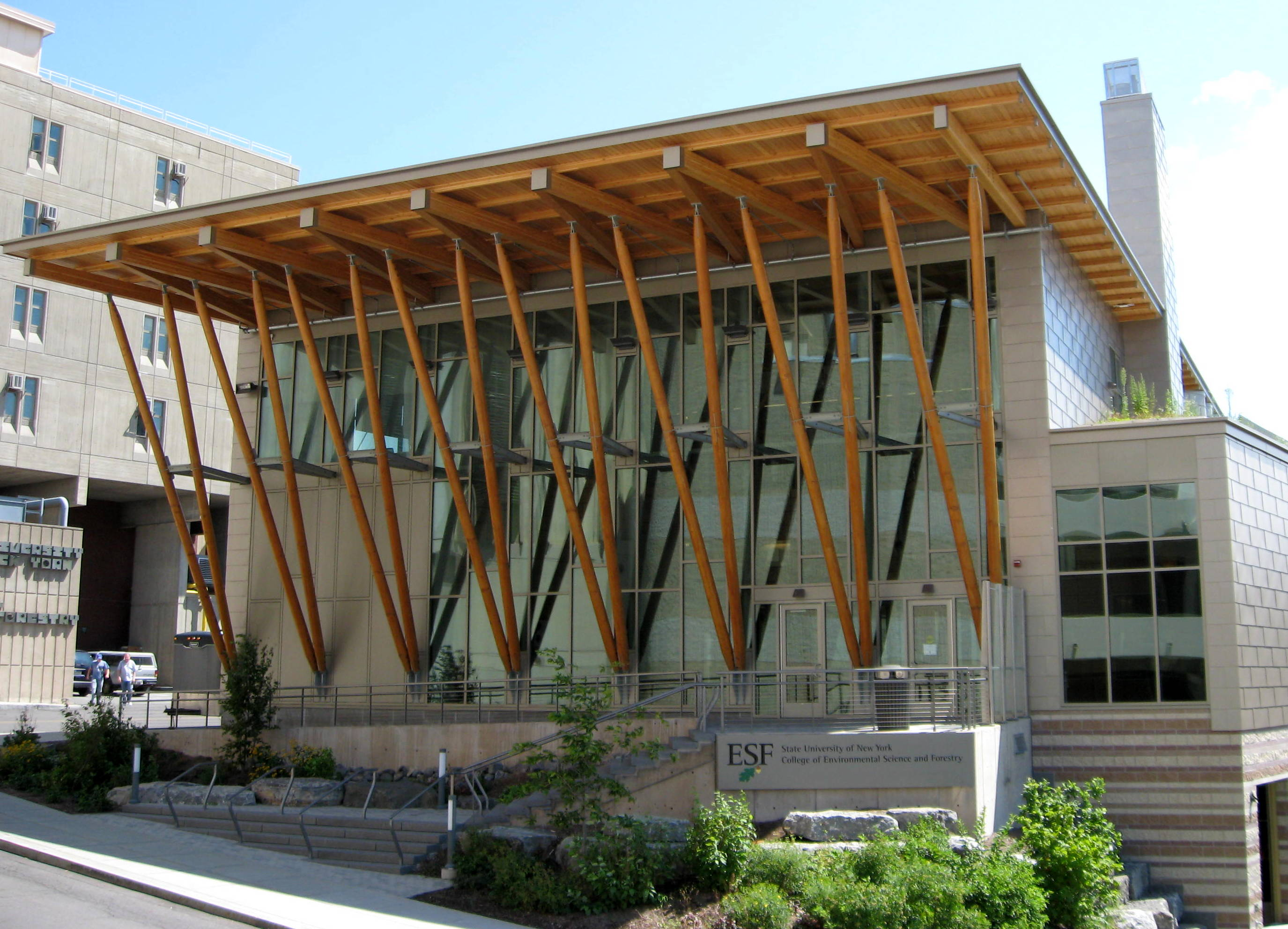
Gateway Center

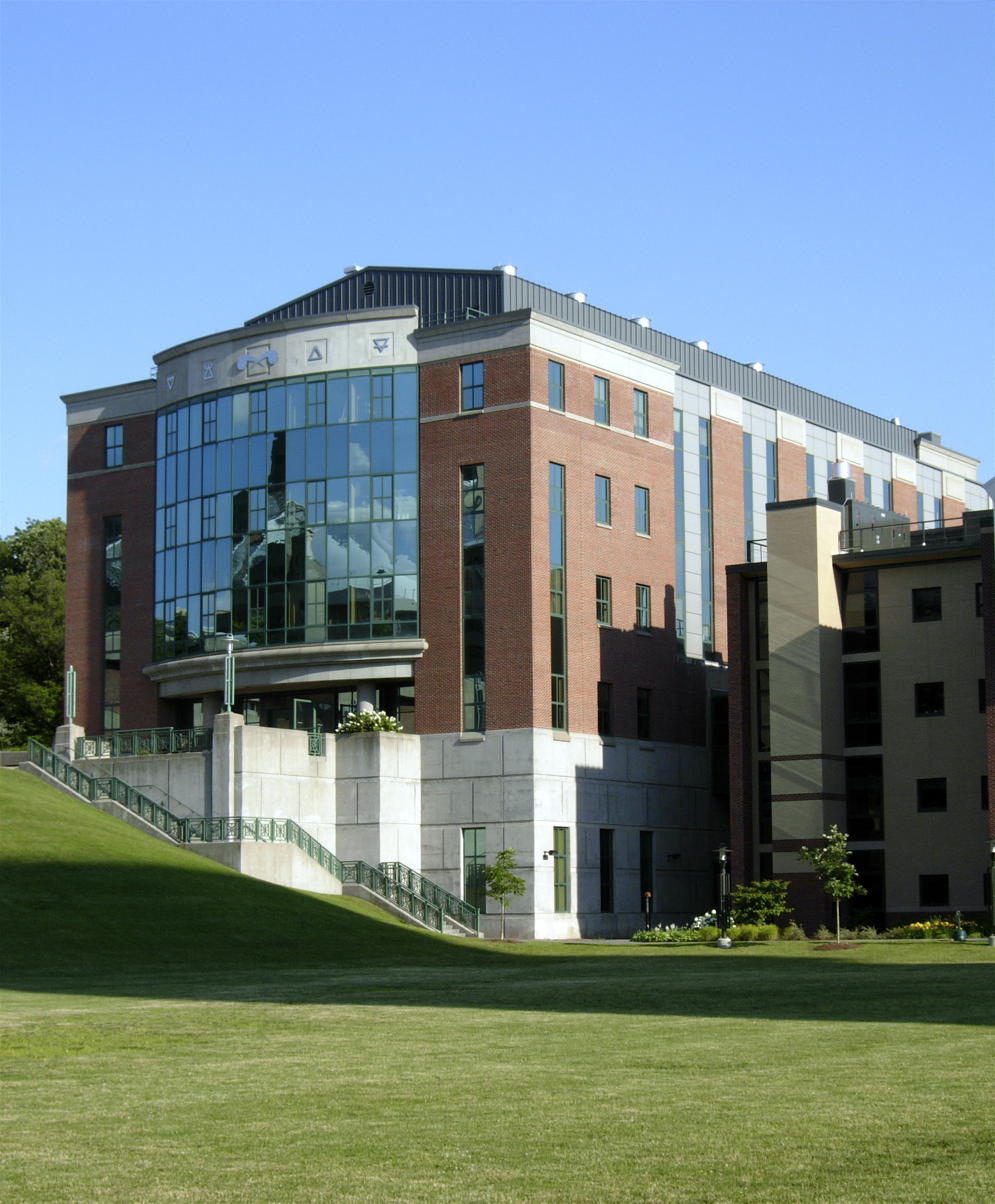
Jahn Laboratory

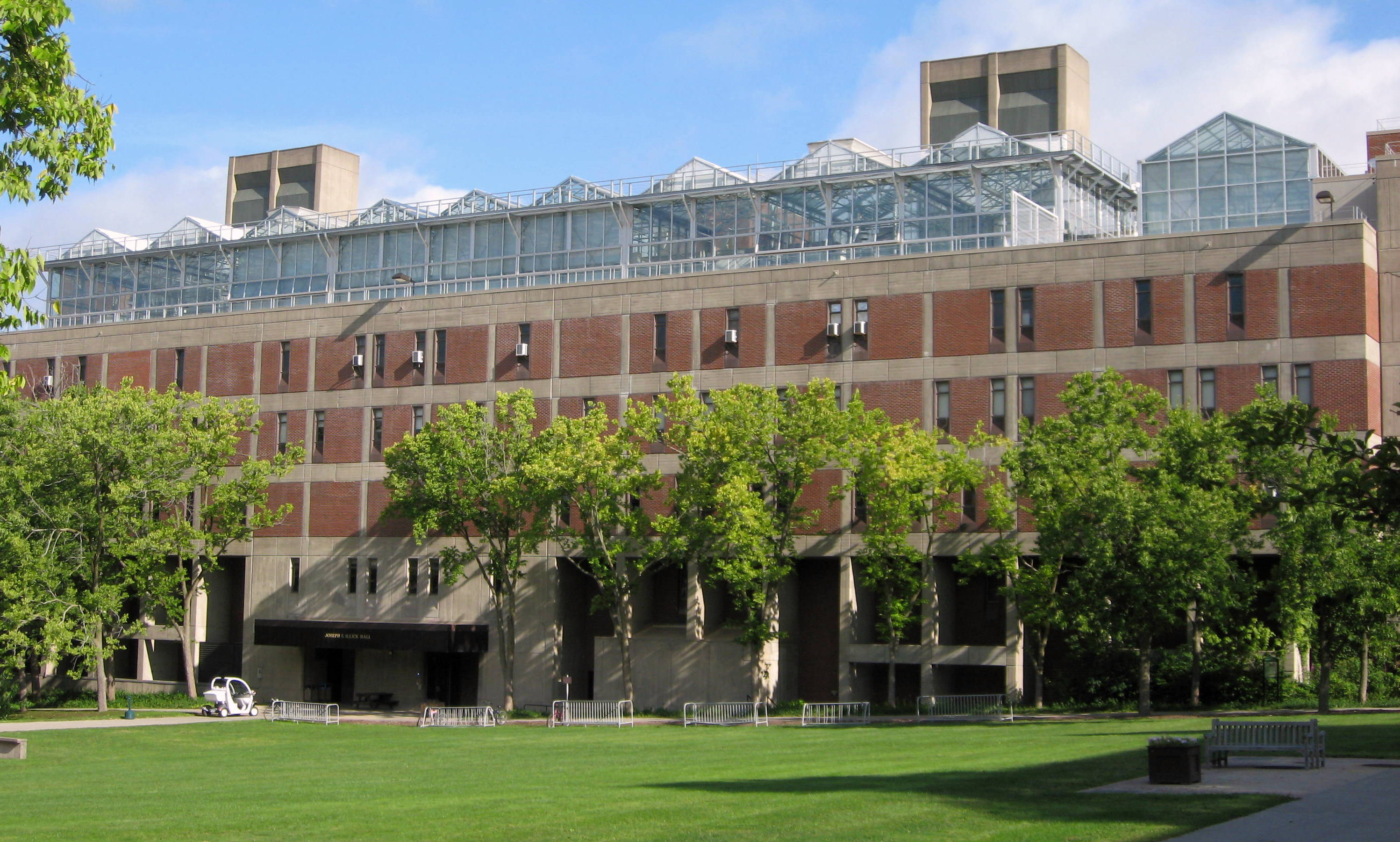
Illick Hall

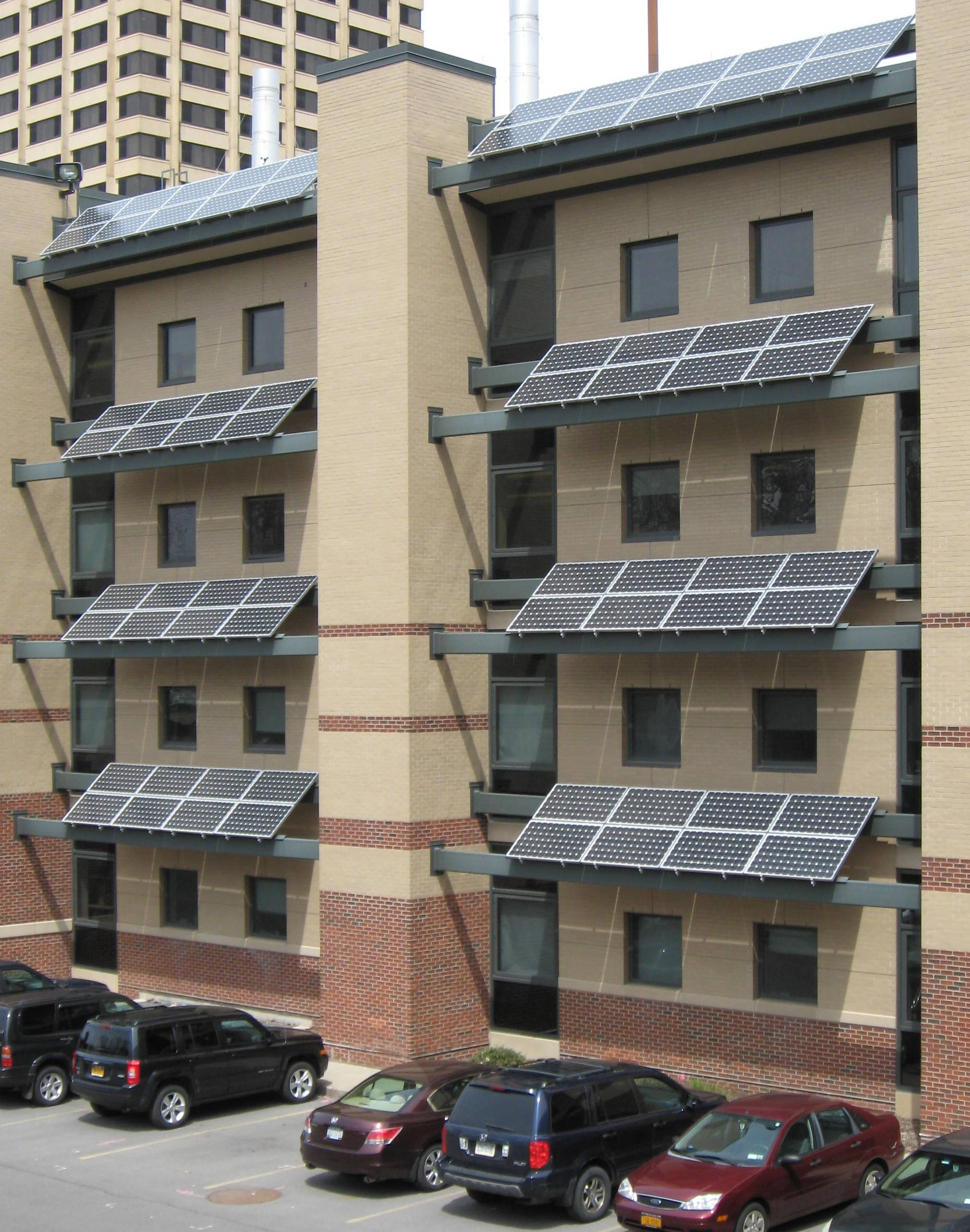
Baker Laboratory

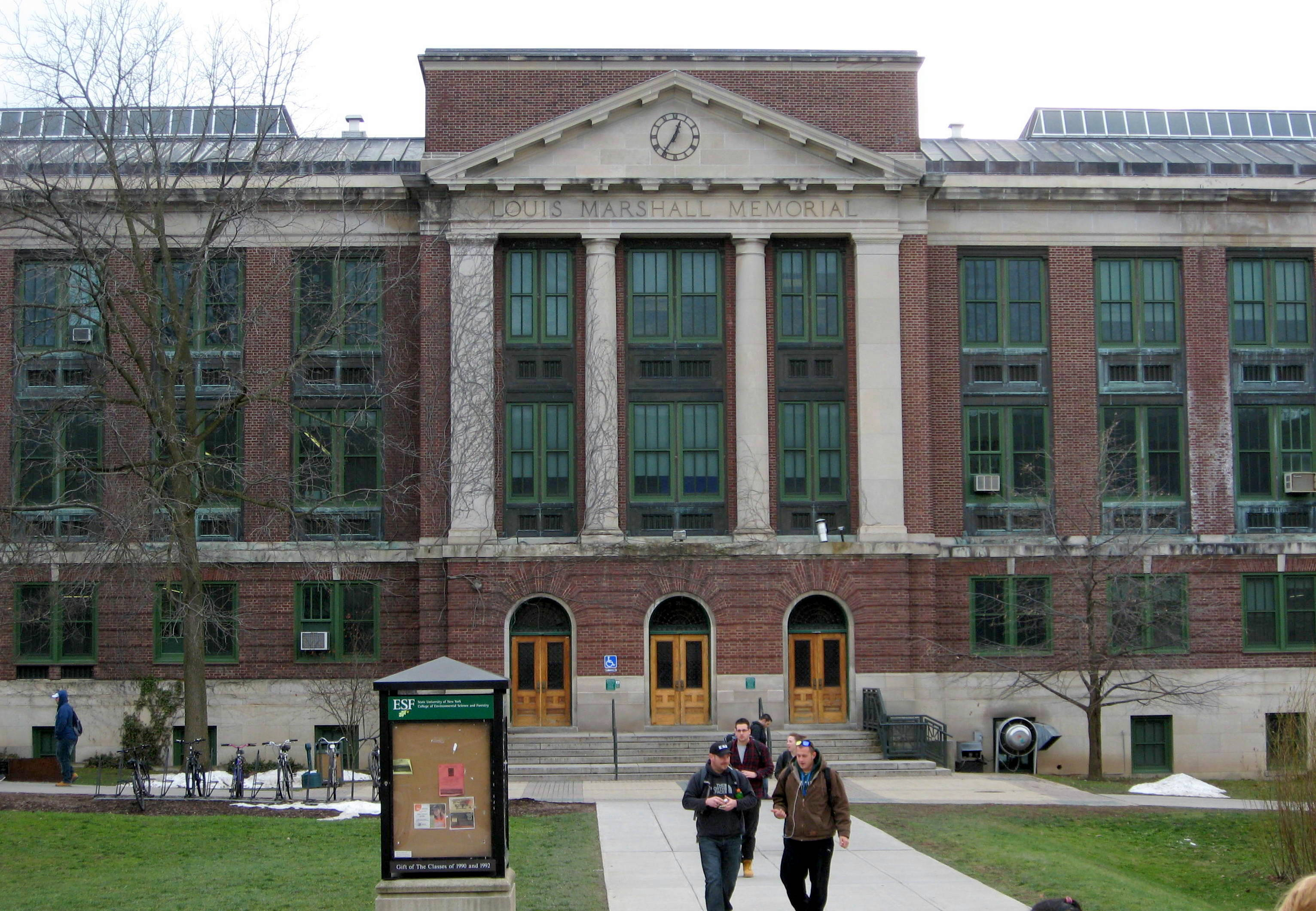
Marshall Hall

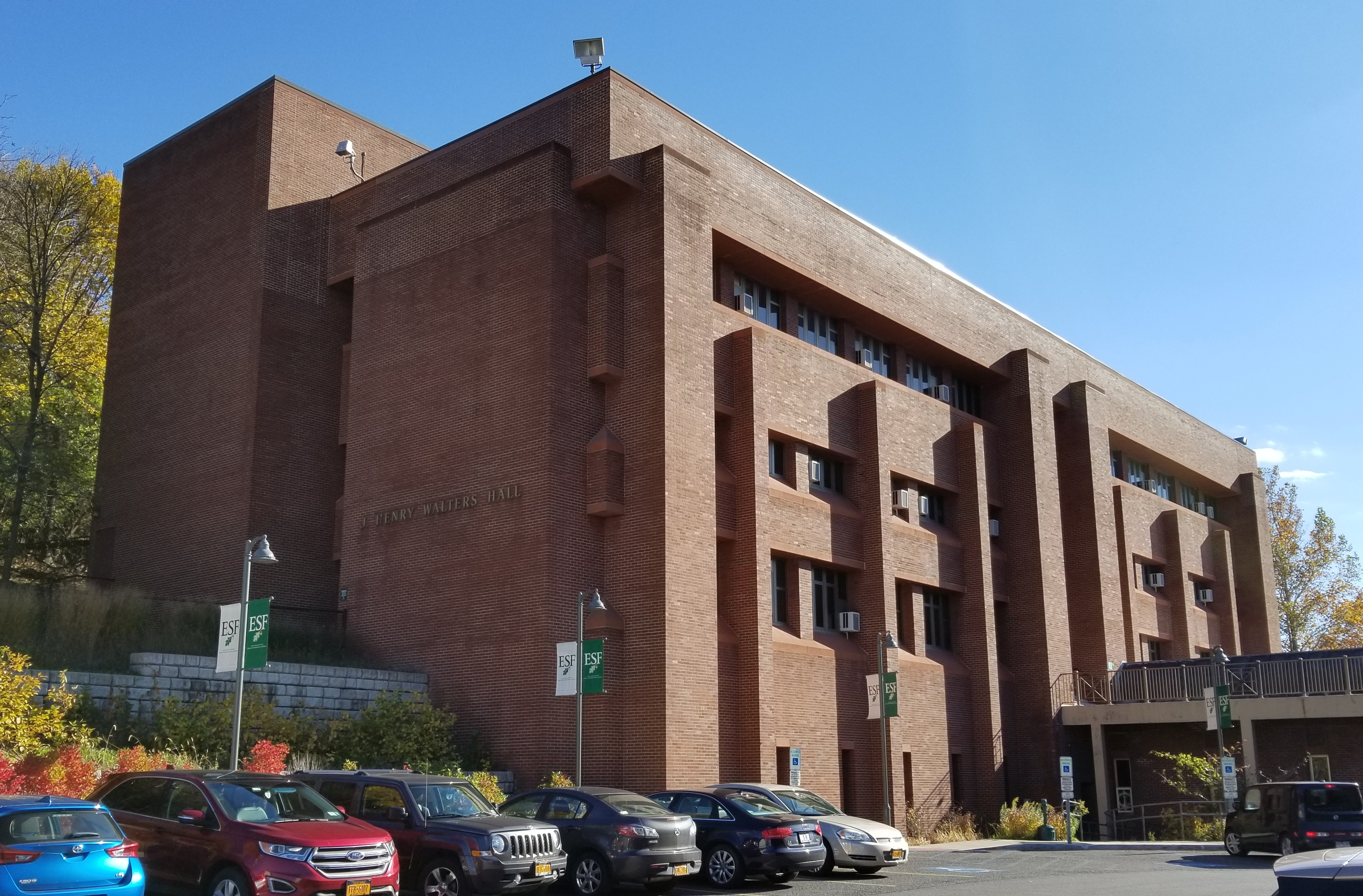
Walters Hall

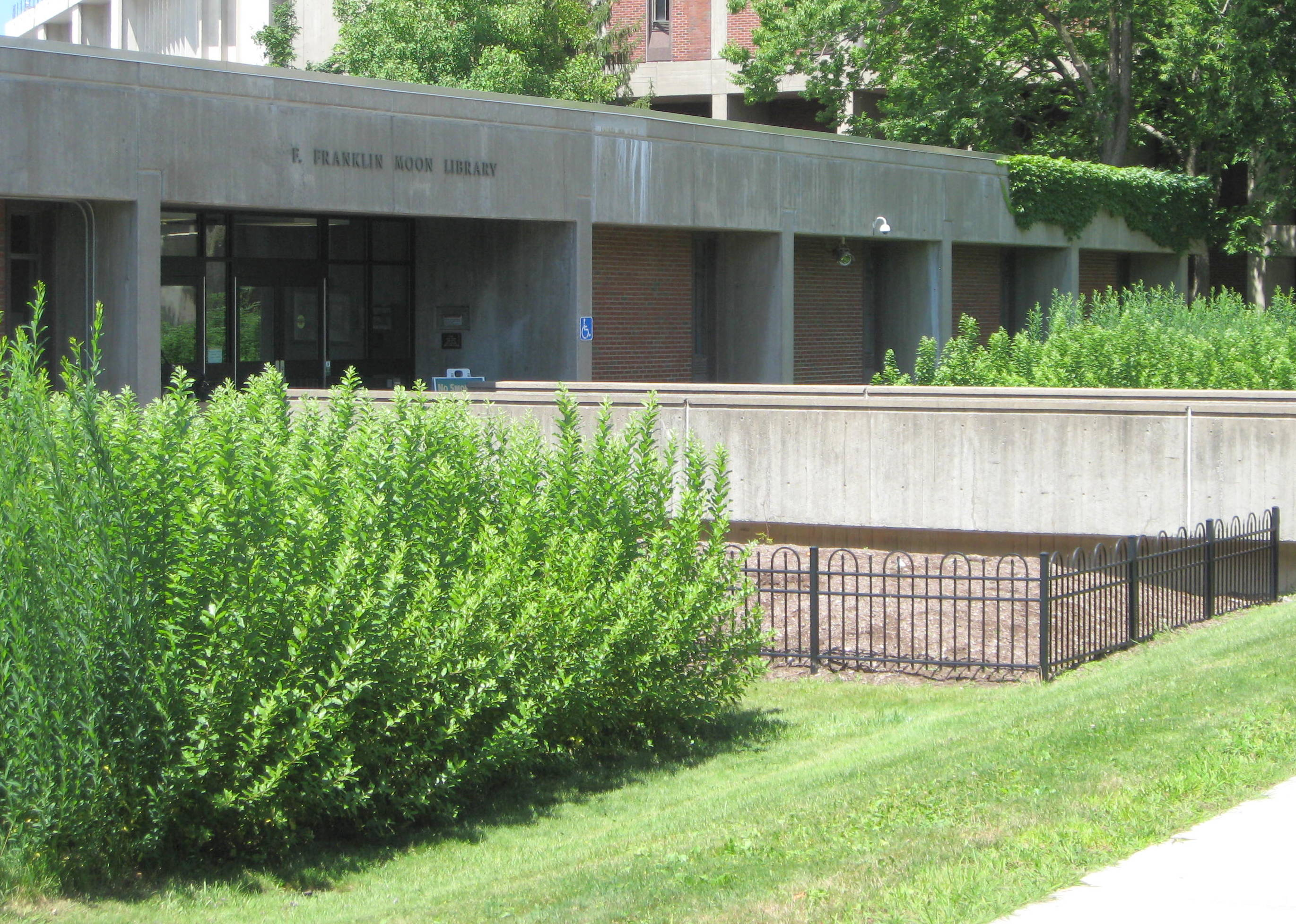
Moon Library

=== Wanakena ===
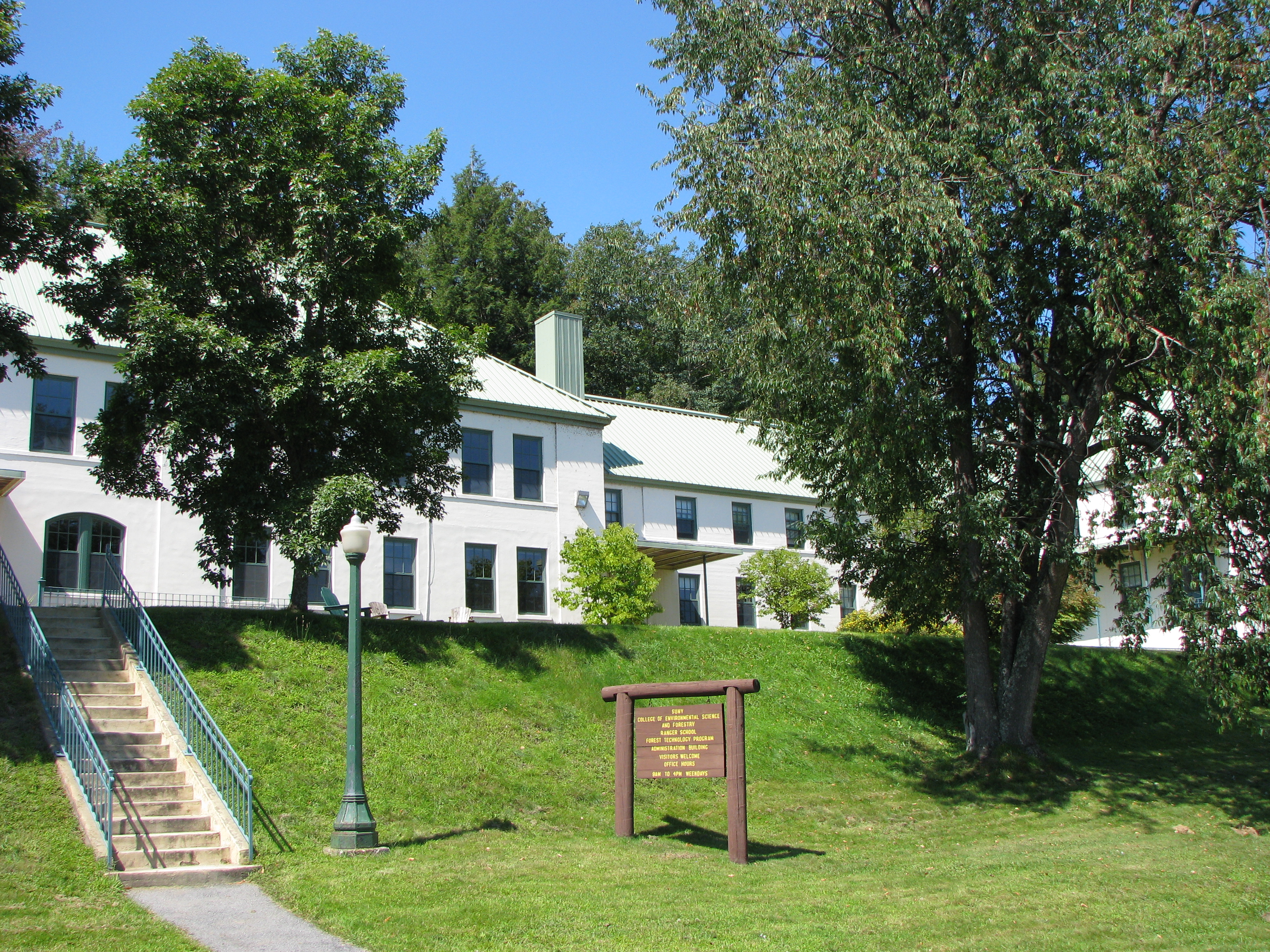
SUNY-ESF Ranger School, Wanakena

Students in the forest and natural resources management curriculum may spend an academic year (48 credits) or summer at the Ranger School, in Wanakena, New York, earning an Associate of Applied Science (A.A.S.) degree in forest technology, surveying, or environmental and natural resources conservation. The campus, established in 1912, is on the east branch of the Oswegatchie River that flows into Cranberry Lake, in the northwestern part of the Adirondack Park. It includes the 3,000-acre (12 km^{2}) James F. Dubuar Memorial Forest, named after a former director of the Ranger School.

=== Field stations and forests ===
New York

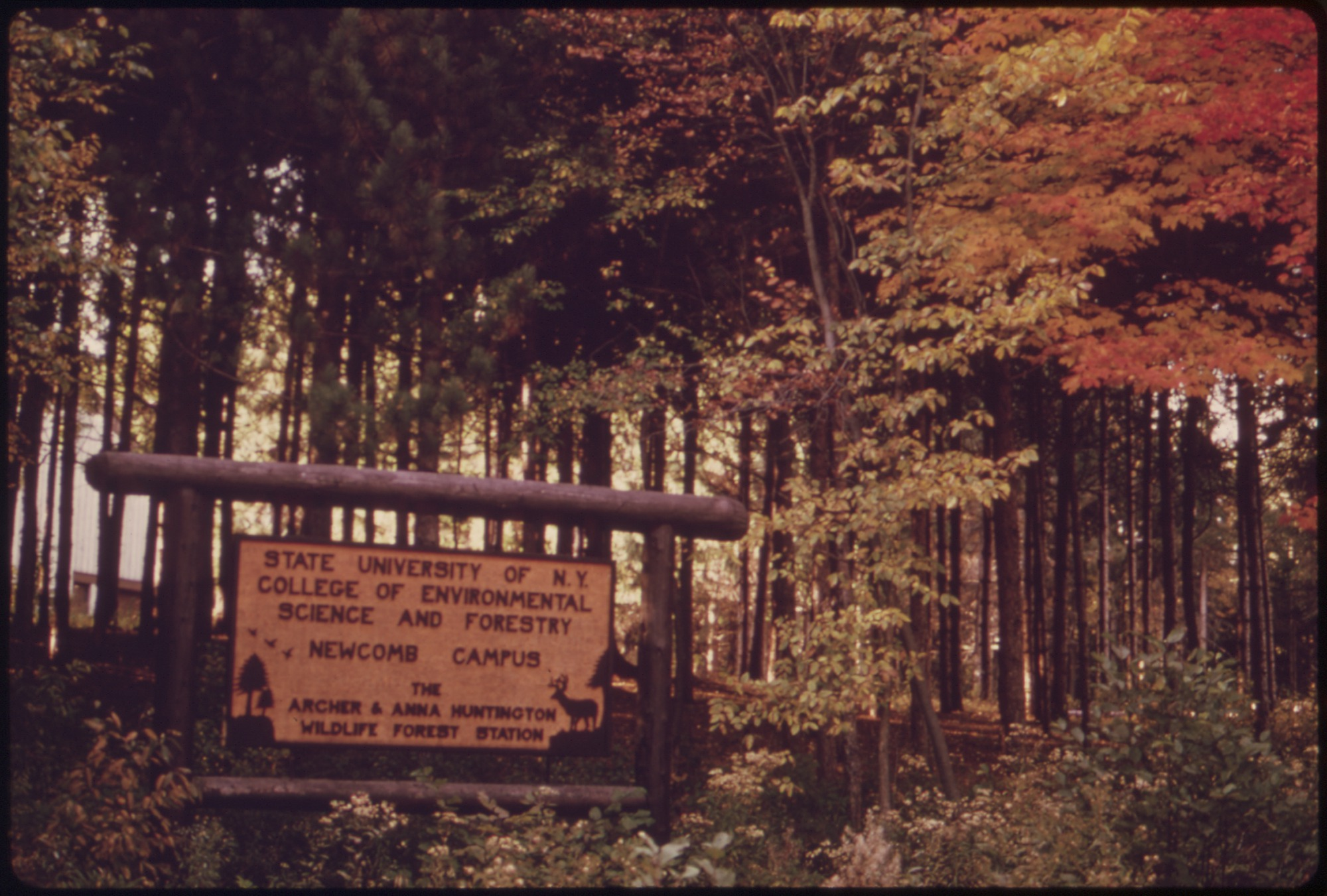
Newcomb campus, c. 1973

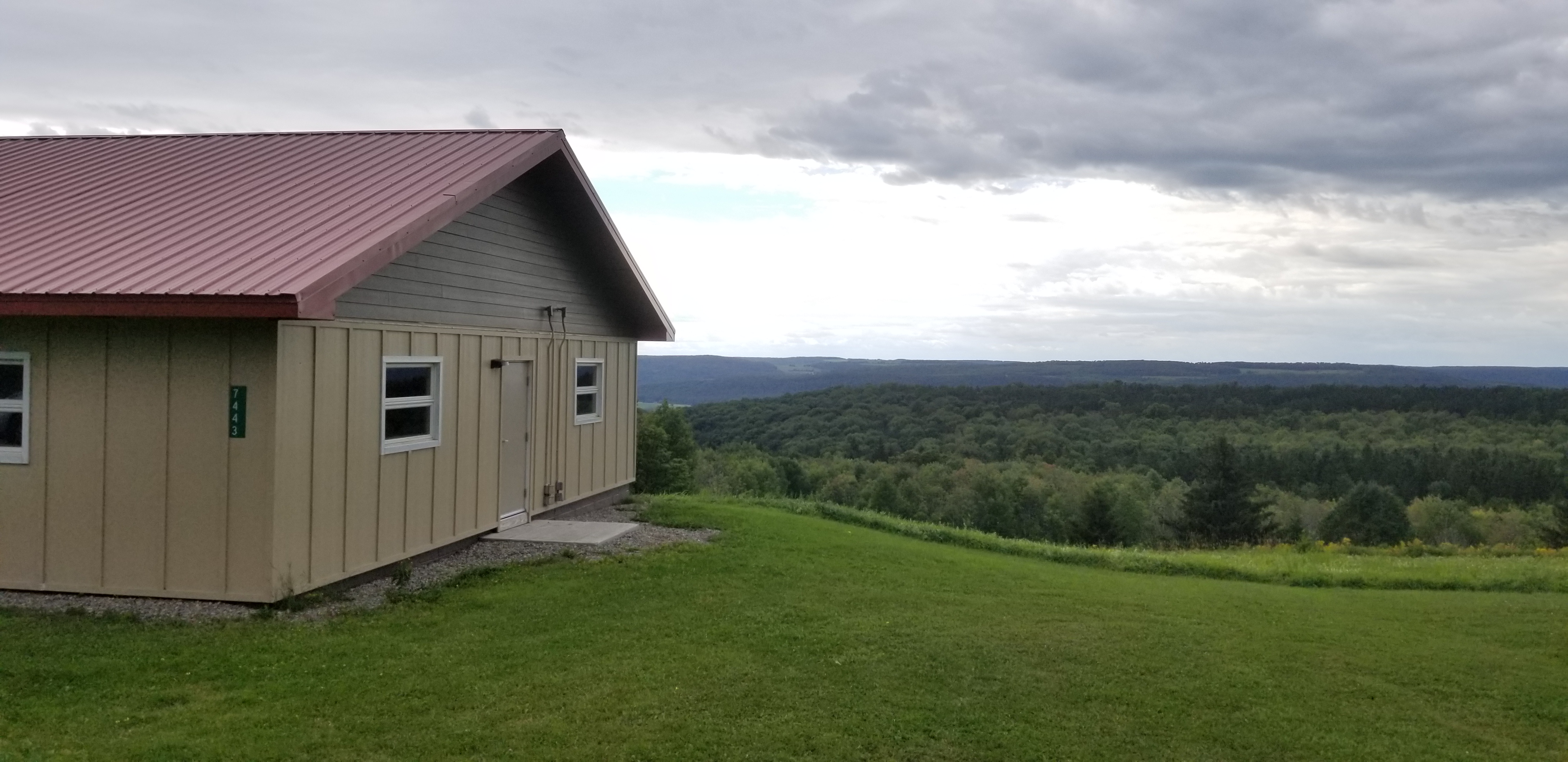
Heiberg Forest classroom, Tully

- Cranberry Lake: The college's environmental and forest biology summer field program is at the Cranberry Lake Biological Station, on Cranberry Lake in the Adirondack Park.
- Newcomb: The Adirondack Ecological Center and Huntington Wildlife Forest, a 15,000-acre (6,000-hectare) field station in the central Adirondack Mountains, are near Newcomb, New York. The site includes the Arbutus Great Camp, bunkhouses, and a dining center, among other facilities.
- Syracuse: The Lafayette Road Experiment Station is in the City of Syracuse.
- Thousand Islands: The Thousand Islands Biological Station and Ellis International Laboratory are in the Thousand Islands, New York.
- Tully: ESF's Tully Field Station and the Svend O. Heiberg Memorial Forest, a 3,800-acre (1,500-hectare) research forest, are in Tully, New York.
- Warrensburg: The Charles Lathrop Pack Demonstration Forest and NYS Department of Environmental Conservation's Environmental Education Camp are near Warrensburg, New York.
- Follensby: Follensby Park, the 14,600-acre property near Tupper Lake where Ralph Waldo Emerson held his historic philosophers camp. The announcement was made during a virtual press conference on Tuesday, February 13, 2024.

Costa Rica

- The Arturo and Maria Sundt Field Station, ESF's first international field station, is used for research and teaching. A former farm, it is near the town of Coyolito, in the province of Guanacaste, Costa Rica, approximately one mile (1.6 km) from the Gulf of Nicoya on the country's west coast.

== Academics ==
Academic rankings

Regional
- U.S. News & World Report: 15

National
- Forbes: 479
- Washington Monthly: 770

The ESF mission statement is "to advance knowledge and skills and to promote the leadership necessary for the stewardship of both the natural and designed environments." ESF is a "specialized institution" of the State University of New York, meaning that curricula focus primarily on one field, the college's being environmental management and stewardship. Students may supplement their education with courses taken at Syracuse University. ESF has academic departments in the fields of chemistry; environmental and forest biology; environmental resources engineering; environmental studies; sustainable resources management; landscape architecture; and chemical engineering. Environmental science programs offer students integrative degrees across the natural sciences.

The admission rate for applicants to ESF is 63 percent (Fall 2024). ESF is ranked at 5th in the 2027 US News & World Report rankings of the top public universities in the north. Furthermore, ESF is 15th in the 2027 US News & World Report list of the best regional universities north (both public and private). U.S. News & World Report ranked ESF as 64th best graduate school in Environmental/ Environmental Health Engineering category in 2016. The Washington Monthly College Guide ranked ESF No. 49 among the nation's top service-oriented colleges and universities for 2012 (and sixth in "community service participation and hours served").

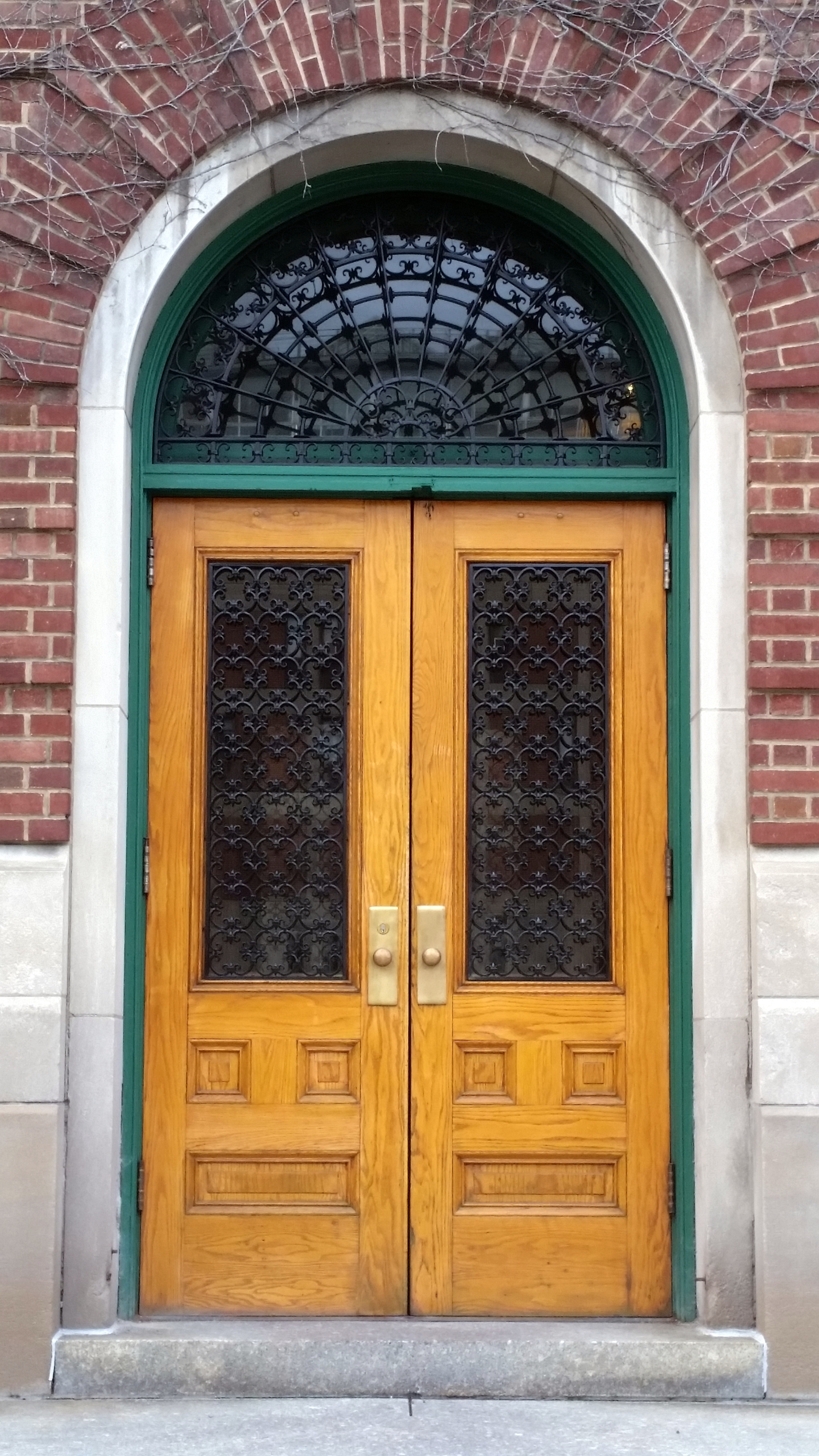
Front entrance, Marshall Hall

Forbes Magazine ranked ESF #54 in its listing of "America's Best College Buys" for 2012. Forbes.com has also ranked ESF at No. 3 on its 2010 list of the 20 best colleges for women in science, technology, engineering and mathematics (STEM). ESF is listed at No. 2, ahead of top programs like Duke, Cornell and Yale, among the best college environmental programs in the nation by Treehugger.com, a website devoted to sustainability and environmental news. In 2007, DesignIntelligence magazine ranked ESF's undergraduate and graduate programs in "Landscape Architecture", respectively at No. 12 and No. 9 in the United States.

The Online College Database ranked ESF at No. 6 on its list of "50 Colleges Committed to Saving the Planet" for 2013. The ranking relates in part to one of the school's newest programs, Sustainable Energy Management. Launched in 2013, the program focuses on energy markets, management, and resources. Global issues such as responsible energy use and development of sustainable energy sources are critical focal points in the STEM major.

== Research ==
ESF is classified by the American Council on Education as a "Mixed Baccalaureate" institution, with a "Research 2: High Research Spending and Doctorate Production" designation. The first research report published in 1913 by the College of Forestry was the result of the above noted USDA Forest Service supported study of the wood-using industries of New York State. Since that time, the research initiatives of the State University of New York College of Environmental Science and Forestry (ESF) have expanded greatly as faculty and students conduct pioneering studies, many with a global reach. ESF researchers delve into topics well beyond the boundaries of central New York. Recent international sites of research interest include Madagascar, the Amazon floodplains, Mongolia and the Galapagos Islands. Vermont and the Sierra Nevada are other locales within the US where recent research has focused. Current research efforts include the Willow Biomass Project and the American Chestnut Research and Restoration Project which produced the Darling 58 chestnut tree.

== Campus life ==
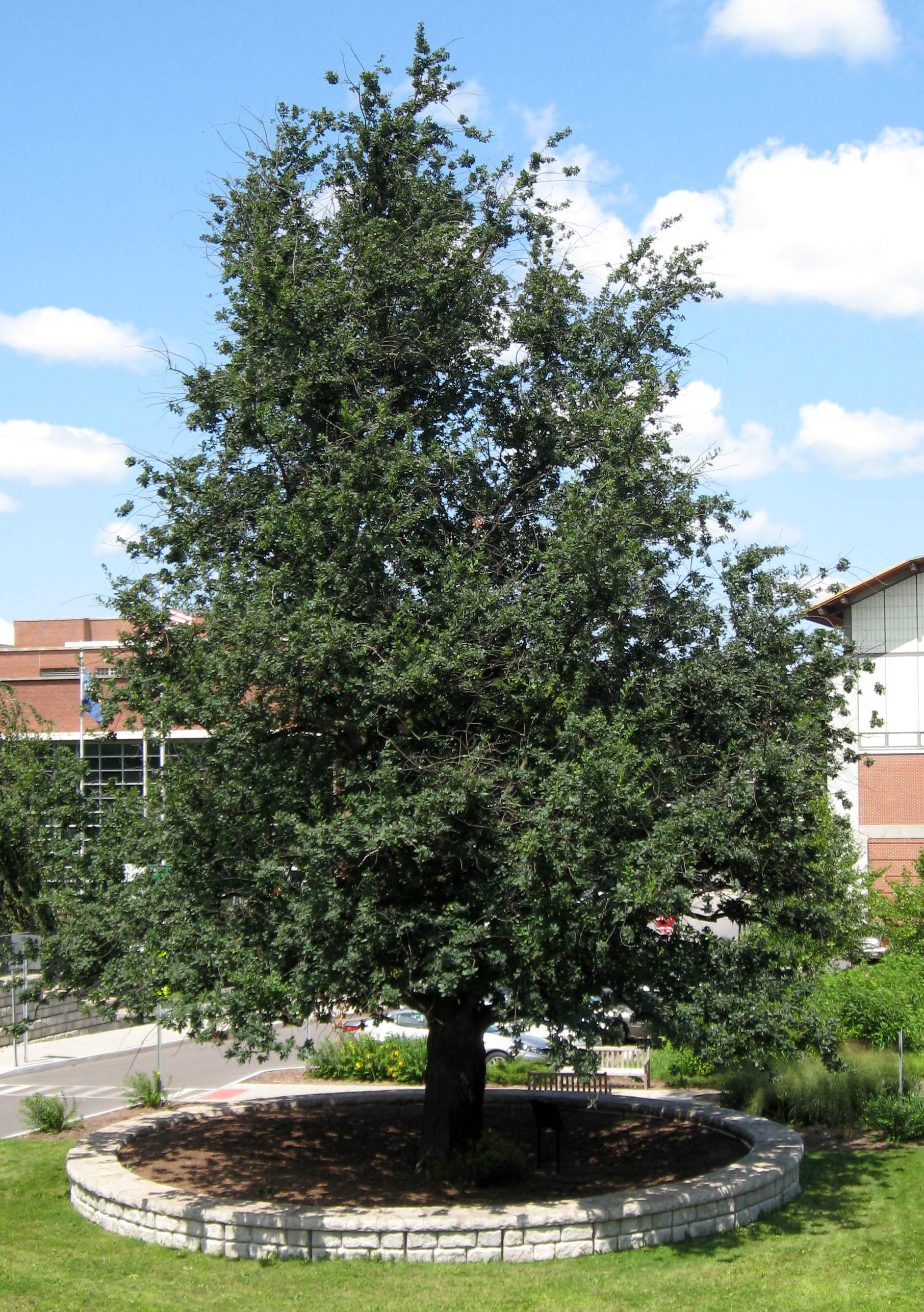
The 'Robin Hood Oak' (Q. robur), direct descendant of Major Oak, of Sherwood Forest, England

Many students identify themselves as a "Stumpy" (or "Stumpie"). The nickname was given to students by their neighbors at Syracuse University, probably in the 1920s, and most-likely refers to forestry "stump jumpers". Although originally used as an insult, today, most students embrace the nickname with pride.

Students at the Syracuse campus enjoy many activities on and off campus. There are a number of student clubs and organizations at ESF, including the Mighty Oaks Student Assembly (formerly United Students Association), Graduate Student Association, the Guy A. Baldassare Birding Club, the Student Environmental Education Coalition, the Woodsmen Team, Bob Marshall Club, Alpha Xi Sigma Honor Society, Soccer Team, Sigma Lambda Alpha, The Knothole (weekly newspaper), Papyrus Club, The Empire Forester (yearbook), Landscape Architecture Club (formally the Mollet Club), Forest Engineers Club, Environmental Studies Student Organization, Habitat for Humanity, Ecologue (yearly journal), the Bioethics Society, Green Campus Initiative, Baobab Society, NYPIRG, and the Sustainable Energy Club. Wanakena students have their own woodsmen and ice hockey teams. A number of professional organizations are also open to student membership, including the Society of American Foresters, The Wildlife Society, Conservation Biology club, American Fisheries Association, and the (defunct) American Water Resources Association.

ESF has an agreement with adjacent Syracuse University that allows ESF students to enjoy many amenities offered by SU. ESF students take courses at their sister institution, can apply for admission to concurrent degree and joint certificate programs, and may join any SU organization except for NCAA sports teams. SU students are also welcome to enroll in ESF classes. Because of this, students feel a certain degree of integration with the Syracuse University community. Every May, ESF holds a joint commencement ceremony with Syracuse University in the Carrier Dome. ESF's baccalaureate diplomas bear the seals of the State University of New York and Syracuse University.

Students also enjoy a variety of shops, restaurants, museums, and theaters in Syracuse, and nearby Marshall Street and Westcott Street.

== Gateway Center ==
ESF has launched several programs, within the confines of campus and other locations, to reduce its carbon emissions. The Gateway Center utilizes sustainable energy resources to generate power and heat utilized across the campus. The building includes a state-of-the-art, combined heat-and-power (CHP) system, producing 65% of campus heating needs along with 20% of its electrical needs. The CHP system uses biomass to drive a steam turbine and produce electricity, while natural gas is used for steam heating along with additional electricity. It has been estimated this building alone is responsible for reducing ESF's carbon footprint by 22%.

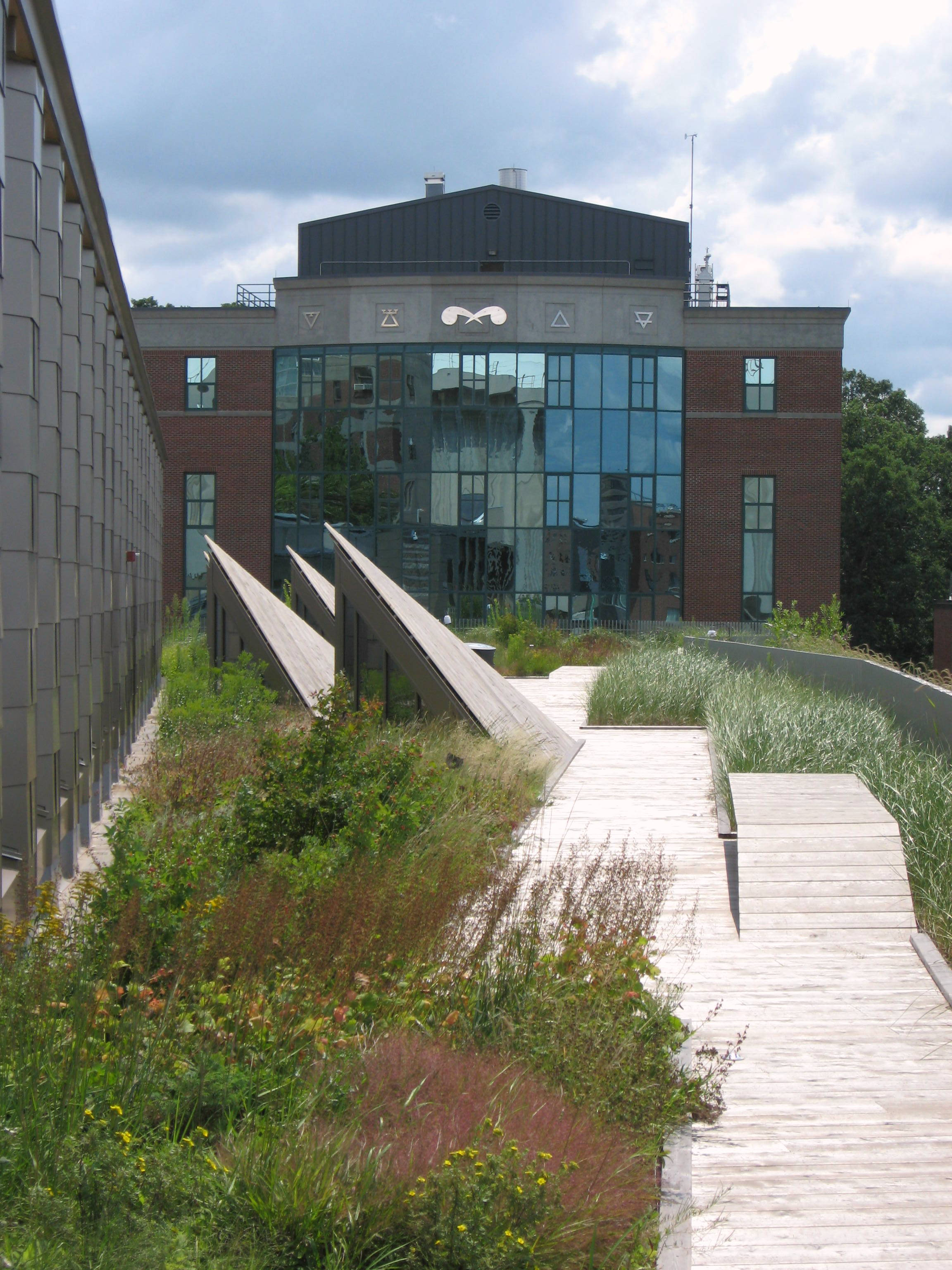
The Gateway Center's green roof/ garden (foreground)

Increased global awareness of global warming and reduced nonrenewable resources has driven ESF to invest in biomass. Biomass is a renewable resource that draws light energy, carbon dioxide, and water from the environment; in return oxygen is released. It can be harvested without negatively affecting the environment. For this reason, ESF launched a program to grow its own biomass, known as the Willow Biomass Project. Benefits of woody willow include, high yields and fast growth times, quick re-sprouting, and high heat energy is produced when burned. Woody willow also increases habitat diversity significantly contributes to carbon neutrality.

The Gateway Center was one of the final stages in the school's Climate Action Plan, that encompasses the vision of carbon neutrality and reduced fossil fuel dependence by 2015. Currently, the school rests in Phase III of the program and is on track to reach its goal. Included in Phase III is the opening of The Gateway Center, retrofits to Illick Hall, and rooftop greenhouse replacement. One other advancement towards carbon neutrality can be seen on top of the campus's buildings. Rooftop gardens provide reduced energy consumption and water runoff. Shrubbery, soil thickness, and moisture content all can contribute to increased energy savings. Gateway and other buildings on campus utilize rooftop gardens to reduce energy consumption and water runoff.

== Athletics ==
The SUNY ESF athletic teams are called the Mighty Oaks. The college is a member the United States Collegiate Athletic Association (USCAA), primarily competing in the Hudson Valley Intercollegiate Athletic Conference (HVIAC) since about the 2004–05 academic year.

ESF competes in 11 intercollegiate varsity sports: Men's sports include basketball, cross country, golf, soccer and track & field; while women's sports include cross country, soccer and track & field; and co-ed sports include bass fishing and timber sports.

=== Cross country ===
The school's men's cross-country team are eight-time USCAA national champions (2011–2014; 2021–2024). The women's cross-country team are five-time USCAA national champions (2018; 2021–2024). In 2024, ESF became the only USCAA school to win 4 consecutive titles for both men's and women's competition in the same sport.

=== Soccer ===
The men's soccer team was invited to the 2012 USCAA National Championship Tournament in Asheville, North Carolina, making it to the semifinals.

=== Timber sports ===
ESF has a long tradition of competing in intercollegiate woodsman competitions in the northeastern US and eastern Canada. The team came in first in both the men's and women's divisions of the northeastern US and Canadian 2012 spring meet. Students at the SUNY-ESF Ranger School, in Wanakena, compete as the Blue Ox Woodsmen team.

=== Club sports ===
In addition to the intercollegiate USCAA and woodsman teams, ESF students participate on club sports teams at both ESF and Syracuse University, including ESF's competitive bass fishing team, and SU's quidditch team. Students at the Ranger School participate in the Ranger School Hockey Club.

=== Athletics history ===
In one notable part of the college's history, Laurie D. Cox, professor of Landscape Architecture, was responsible for establishing Syracuse University's renowned lacrosse program in 1916, including players from the New York State College of Forestry.

== Affiliation with Syracuse University ==
ESF was founded in 1911 as the New York State College of Forestry at Syracuse University, under the leadership of Syracuse University Trustee Louis Marshall, with the active support of Syracuse University Chancellor Day. Its founding followed several years after the cessation of state funding to the earlier New York State College of Forestry at Cornell.

ESF is an autonomous institution, administratively separate from Syracuse University, while some resources, facilities and infrastructure are shared. The two schools share a common Schedule of Classes; students may take courses at both institutions, and baccalaureate diplomas from ESF bear the Syracuse University seal along with that of the State University of New York. A number of concurrent degree programs and certificates are offered between the schools. ESF receives an annual appropriation as part of the SUNY budget and the state builds and maintains all of the college's educational facilities. The state has somewhat similar financial and working relationships with five statutory colleges that are at Alfred University and Cornell University, although unlike ESF, these statutory institutions are legally and technically part of their respective host institutions and are administered by them as well.

ESF faculty, students, and students' families join those from Syracuse University (SU) in a joint convocation ceremony at the beginning of the academic year in August and combined commencement exercises in May. ESF and SU students share access to library resources, recreational facilities, student clubs, and activities at both institutions, except for the schools' intercollegiate athletics teams, affiliated with the USCAA and NCAA, respectively. At least one ESF student has played Syracuse's mascot, Otto the Orange.

== Traditions ==
The best known tradition among ESF students is that walking across the quad is shunned. The tradition, which dates back to at least the early 1960s, is intended to inhibit tracks from being worn into the lawn. Hecklers have been known to yell and even tackle people walking across the quad. However, other activities such as frisbee and soccer are encouraged on the Quad.

Eustace B. Nifkin, ESF's previous mascot, is an unofficial student. He first appeared in the 1940s after a group of students summering in the Adirondacks thought him up. Ever since, he has appeared on class rosters, written articles for The Knothole, and sent mail to the college from around the world. He has a girlfriend, the lesser-known Elsa S. Freeborn. SUNY granted him a bachelor's degree in 1972. The Alumni Lounge in Marshall Hall is dedicated to Nifkin.

Another well known legend is that of Chainer or Chainsaw who supposedly graduated in 1993.

Traditional events include:

- Earth Week events
- Spring Banquet
- December Soiree
- Friends and Family BBQ
- Coffee Haus
- Festival of Places
- Paper run
- Donut Hours
- Waste Audit
- Free Movies Nights
- Insomniacs
- Woodsman Team (Forestry Club)
- ESF Day of Service
- Quadstock Music and Arts Festival

== Notable alumni ==
More than 19,000 have graduated from ESF since its founding in 1911. The college's Alumni Association was founded 14 years later, in 1925. Notable alumni include:

- Reginald E. Balch, MS '28, Canadian photographer and scientist
- Thomas Balsley, BLA '68, founder and principal designer of Thomas Balsley Associates, a New York City-based landscape design firm
- Diana J. Knight Bendz, BS '68, an American polymer scientist and environmental and industrial engineer
- Bruce C. Bongarten, BS '73, former Provost and Vice President for Academic Affairs, ESF
- Roger Donlon, first man to receive the Medal of Honor in Vietnam
- Christopher Dunn, BS '76, Director of Cornell Plantations
- Ronald J. Eby, BS '69, PhD '74, National Medal of Technology award, 2007 for his work in pediatric medicine. A polysaccharide / carbohydrate chemist whose career was devoted to vaccine development.
- Frank Edwin Egler, plant ecologist and pioneer in the study of vegetation science
- Patrick Flood, BS '74, Maine state legislator
- Sol Feinstone, '15, historian, businessman, conservationist
- Jean Fréchet, MS '69, PhD '71, Henry Rapoport Chair of Organic Chemistry and Professor of Chemical Engineering, UC Berkeley - Dendritic Polymers: Dendrimers; 2013 Japan Prize Laureate His PhD student, Will Dichtel professor of chemistry at Cornell, earns MacArthur 'Genius Award' 9/2015
- Delfin Ganapin Jr., PhD '87, Global Manager, Global Environmental Facility Small Grants Program, United Nations Development Program
- William M. Harlow, BS '25, MS '26, PhD '28, SUNY ESF Professor in the field of wood technology
- Avery Yale Kamila, American journalist, vegan columnist and community organizer.
- David Kaplan, PhD '78, Director, Cellular Agriculture, Tufts University {the only stand-alone institute for Cellular Agriculture in the world}
- Edwin Ketchledge, BS '49, Distinguished Teaching Professor of Botany and Dendrology, ESF
- Robin Wall Kimmerer, BS '75, author of Gathering Moss: A Natural and Cultural History of Mosses; Professor of Biology and Director, Center for Native Peoples, ESF
- Michael Kudish, PhD '71, author, historian, forester and professor.
- Raymond (Ray) Leonard, Ph.D., skipper of the ill-fated sailboat S. V. Satori made famous in the book and movie, The Perfect Storm; a pioneering forest ecologist at Hubbard Brook Experimental Forest in W. Thornton, NH.
- Moshe Levy, PhD '55, professor of chemistry, discoverer of living polymerization, and solar energy researcher
- Mark Marquisee, in the seminal 1965 'Science' paper describing the structure of alanine transfer RNA, linking DNA and protein synthesis for which Robert W. Holley shared the Nobel Prize in Physiology or Medicine in 1968 a member of his team was Mark Marquisee. He graduated from SUNY ESF (NYS College of Forestry) in forest chemistry in either 1959 or 1960 coming to Cornell for his PhD in biochemistry.
- Bob Marshall, BS '24, forester, writer and wilderness activist
- Joe Martens, MS '81, former Commissioner, New York State Department of Environmental Conservation
- Donald E. Moore III, BS, PhD '76, animal behaviorist, zoo-based wildlife biologist, associate director of Animal Care Sciences, Smithsonian National Zoo, Washington, DC
- James D. Morrissey, BS '58, "first American to climb the east face of Mt. Everest"
- Clarence Petty, BS '30, forest ranger, conservationist and outdoorsman
- Harry Frederick Recher, ornithologist
- Bruce Shelley, BS '70, computer game designer
- Sgt. William Shemin, Ranger School 1914, BS after the war, Medal of Honor recipient for bravery in World War I
- Earl Lewis Stone, Jr., BS '38, In 1948, he became the first endowed Charles Lathrop Pack Professor of forest soils at Cornell University. Retired 1979
- Lissa Widdoff, BS '79, executive director, Robert and Patricia Switzer Foundation

== Environmental leadership ==
From soon after its founding, ESF affiliated individuals have been responsible for establishing and leading prominent scientific and advocacy organizations around the world focused on the environment. Others have provided leadership to governmental environmental agencies.

- Adirondack Council – Clarence Petty, '30, co-founder, 1975, director
- Adirondack Park Agency – Ross S. Whaley, former ESF President, chair, 2003–07
- Association for the Protection of the Adirondacks – Louis Marshall, President, ESF Board of Trustees, trustee; Paul Schaefer, Trustee and V.P. for 50 years
- Ecological Society of America – Dean William L. Bray, and Professor Charles C. Adams, co-founders, 1915
- Finger Lakes Land Trust – Summer 2011: Cornelius B. Murphy Jr. named to Advisory Council along with Lynn Leopold, widow of A. Carl Leopold, Founding President
- National Parks Association – Bob Marshall, '24, board member, 1930s
- The Nature Conservancy – Dean William L. Bray, co-founder, 1950
- Onondaga Environmental Institute — Ed Michalenko, PhD '91, President
- Society of American Foresters – Ross S. Whaley, former ESF President, president, 1991
- Taiwan Environmental Action Network – Wen-ling Tu, MS '96, co-founder
- Union of Concerned Scientists – Howard "Bud" Ris, Jr., MLA '75, executive director, president, 1984–2003
- United States Society for Ecological Economics – Dr. Karin Limburg, ESF faculty member, president, 2006–07; Dr. Valerie Luzadis, ESF faculty member, president, 2012–14
- The Wilderness Society – Bob Marshall, '24, co-founder, 1935

== See also ==
- Adirondack High Peaks, ESF's origins and inspiration
- Adirondack Park Agency visitor interpretive centers
- History of the New York State College of Forestry
- List of heads of the New York State College of Forestry
- François André Michaux laid the foundation for American forestry with his work, The North American Sylva {akin to John James Audubon "The Birds of America"} starting in 1811.
