= William M. Harlow =

- Born: 1900; Syracuse, New York, US
- Died: 1986 (aged 85–86)
- Education: NYS College of Forestry
- Occupations: Nature photographer and filmmaker
- Years active: 1930–1970
- Notable work: Harlow was a professor of wood technology who traveled extensively through forested regions of the United States and Canada. He wrote seven books and produced 28 educational films, most of which featured time-lapse photography. His films won international recognition and he worked with the Disney studios on a 1956 feature, "The Secrets of Life," part of the award-winning series, "True Life Adventures."
- Spouse: Alma M. Harlow (1902–1983)

William M. Harlow (1900–1986) was an American professor of engineering and silviculture at the SUNY College of Environmental Science and Forestry. He was also a nature photographer and filmmaker, particularly of time-lapse films.

== Education and career ==
Harlow was a native of Syracuse, New York. He graduated from Blodgett Vocational High School and attended the NYS College of Forestry (now SUNY College of Environmental Science and Forestry), receiving a bachelor's degree in 1925, a master's degree in 1926, and a doctorate in 1928. Harlow was a member of the faculty of the college from 1928 until his retirement in 1965, serving as an instructor, assistant professor, associate professor, and professor in the field of wood technology. He pioneered the research of wood cell wall chemistry.

He authored a number of articles on outdoor education under the pen name "Moosewood", and was a camping consultant for six years to the Rescue Mission's Camp Id-Ra-Ha-Je; in 1963, the camp renamed its main building to Moosewood Lodge. He was the head of the camping department at the Sargent College of Physical Education in Petersboro, N.H (now operated by Boston University as the Sargent Center for Outdoor Education), and taught at several other nature camps. Harlow received the Heiberg Award in 1980 from the New York Forest Owner's Association, and the College of Environmental Science and Forestry's Alumni Association Distinguished Achievement Award in 1984.

== Publications and research interests ==
Harlow wrote seven books. His Textbook of Dendrology is in its sixth edition and has sold more than 120,000 copies. The book focuses on tree identification and characteristics. Other books by Harlow include Trees of Eastern and Central United States and Canada, which sold more than 100,000 copies, and Art Forms from Plant Life, Inside Wood and Ways of the Woods. All of the books were illustrated with photographs taken by Harlow, who was also an accomplished nature photographer and filmmaker. His color enlargements can be found in the Life Nature Library Books The Forest and The Scientist, as well as in McGraw-Hill's Life of the Forest and Life of the Marsh. He also illustrated textbooks for other publishers, and sets of slides have been distributed by Ward's Natural Science of Rochester.

== Film work ==
Harlow also contributed to producing films for Walt Disney Studios and Encyclopædia Britannica. He produced 11 films for Encyclopædia Britannica which sold more than 13,000 copies. In all, Harlow produced 28 16mm films, which won 13 national awards. He received the American Film Council's Golden Reel Award in 1955 for Insect Catchers of the Bog Jungle and later received the Blue Ribbon Award for Tree Portraits.

== Publications ==
Books

- Harlow, W. M., & Harrar, E. S. (1968). Textbook of dendrology, covering the important forest trees of the United States and Canada. New York: McGraw-Hill.
- Harlow, W. M. (1959). Fruit key and twig key to trees and shrubs: Fruit key to northeastern trees: Twig key to the deciduous woody plants of eastern North America. New York: Dover Publications.
- Harlow, W. M. (1957). Trees of the Eastern and Central United States and Canada. New York: Dover Publications.
- Harlow, W. M. (1966). Patterns of life: The unseen world of plants. New York: Harper & Row.
- Harlow, W. M. (1976). Art forms from plant life. New York: Dover Publications.
