= Willow Biomass Project =

Sustainable agriculture project in New York State

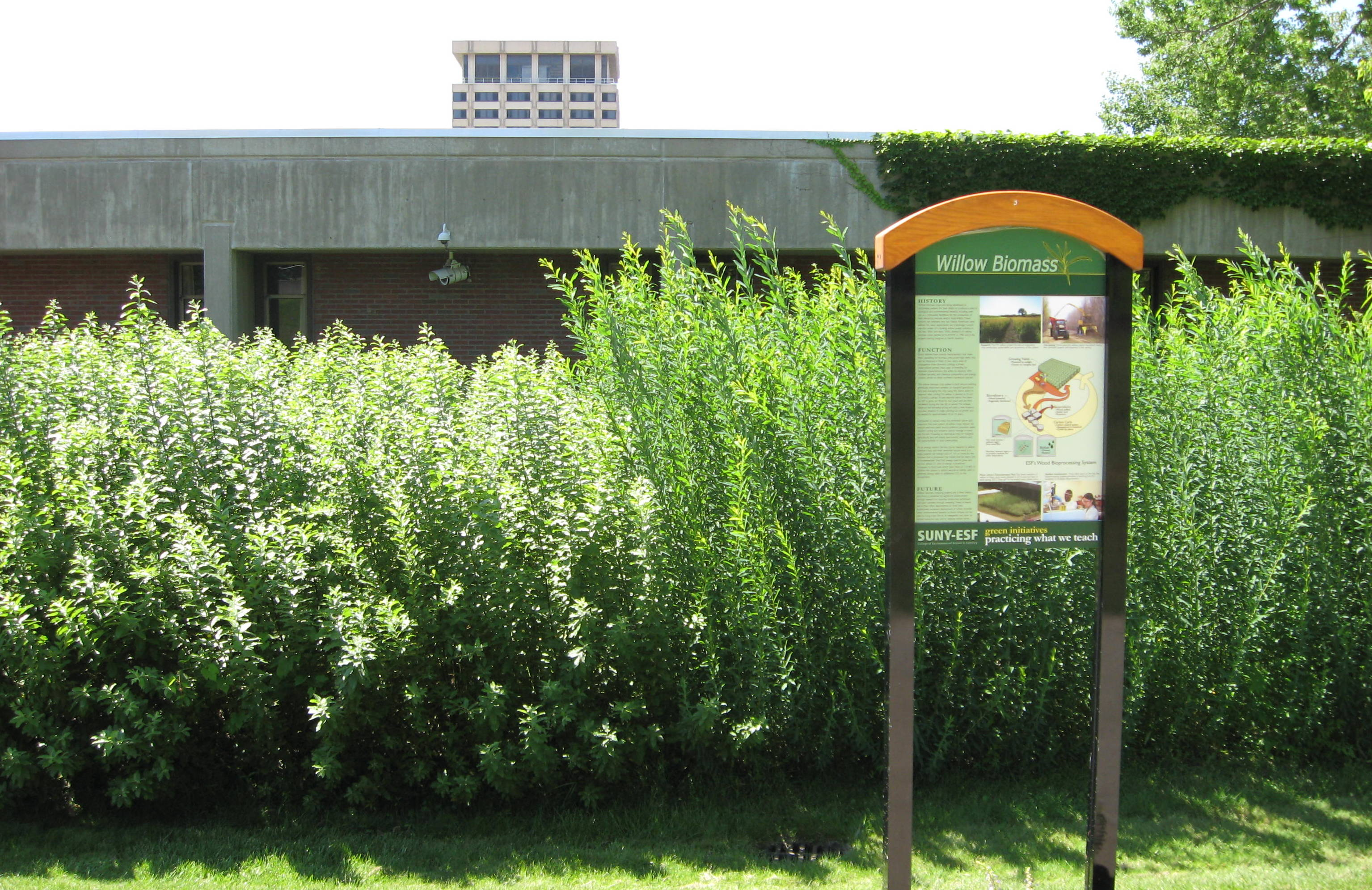
Willow Biomass Project demonstration plot, SUNY-ESF, Syracuse, New York

The Willow Biomass Project is a collaborative effort by members of the Salix Consortium to grow willow and other sustainable woody crops in upstate New York. The project, funded through the U.S. Department of Energy's Biomass Power for Rural Development Program, seeks to commercialize willow bioenergy crops as a renewable source of biofuel. To date, the project has planted willow on at least 465 acres (1.9 km^{2}) of privately leased land and 25 acres (100,000 m^{2}) of farmer-contracted land.

== Willow ==
Willow was chosen for the project for several reasons. It provides a similar amount of energy per ton as other hardwoods, but can be cultivated every few years at relatively low cost. It propagates very easily from cuttings, has a quick growth cycle, and tends to regrow following harvest. SUNY-ESF estimates that it can be harvested six to seven times before it needs to be replanted.

== Salix Consortium ==
The Salix Consortium was an association of 20 New York universities and corporations, including Niagara Mohawk Power Corporation, SUNY College of Environmental Science and Forestry, NYS Energy Research and Development Authority, Cornell University's Departments of Biological and Agricultural Engineering and Ornithology, Antares Group, Inc. and others.

== See also ==
- Coppicing
