= Eustace B. Nifkin =

Fictional student at the SUNY College of Environmental Science and Forestry

Eustace B. Nifkin is a fictional student and tradition at the SUNY College of Environmental Science and Forestry. Nifkin first appeared on the campus of the SUNY College of Environmental Science and Forestry in the 1940s.

== History ==
Nifkin is the unofficial student of the SUNY College of Environmental Science and Forestry. His name appears on class rosters and other official college documents (though no one seems to know how). The student lounge in Marshall Hall is commonly called “Nifkin” Lounge in his honor. He received a SUNY diploma in 1972, but evidently returned to ESF to work on a second degree. He is well-traveled: Eustace sends mail to ESF from all over the world. No portrait of him has yet been found, though he's had the back of his head appear in several editions of the yearbook. In the past, seniors included Eustace somehow in their commencement celebrations.

Nifkin has been the subject of a number of newspaper and newsletter articles including ones by the Syracuse University Daily Orange and the SUNY College of Environmental Science and Forestry Student newsletter - The Knothole. Extensive articles on Nifkin can be found in historical Knotholes and current Knotholes, as he is a popular topic. These articles give the history of how Nifkin came to be and how Nifkin Lounge on the SUNY College of Environmental Science and Forestry campus was named.

Images of what many think Nifkin looks like have appeared in articles and on memorabilia relating to The SUNY College of Environmental Science and Forestry. The Archives and Special Collections of the SUNY College of Environmental Science and Forestry has a collection of items relating to Nifkin including class registration cards, letters, holiday cards, etc.

== See also ==
- George P. Burdell, a similar fictional student who has been "enrolled" at Georgia Tech nearly continuously since the 1920s
- Josiah S. Carberry, a fictional professor at Brown University
