= Diana Bendz =

American polymer scientist

- Born: Diana J. Knight Bendz
- Education: State University of New York College of Environmental Science and Forestry (B.S., 1968); Syracuse University (B.S., 1968)
- Awards: IEEE Centennial Key-to-the-Future Award (1984); IEEE Third Millennium Medal; EIA Environmental Progress Individual Award; SUNY ESF Graduates of Distinction Lifetime Achievement Award (2015)
- Engineering career
- Discipline: Polymer chemistry, environmental engineering, industrial ecology, electronics packaging
- Practice name: IBM Corporation (Director of Environmentally Conscious Products)
- Projects: IBM desktop PC utilizing 100% recycled plastic resin (1999); IBM global asset take-back and computer recycling infrastructure Girls Balance the Equation foundation

Diana J. Knight Bendz is an American polymer scientist and environmental and industrial engineer who has promoted environmentally-conscious manufacturing processes in her work at IBM, and promoted the participation of women and girls in science, technology, engineering, and mathematics.

== Education and career ==
Bendz earned a bachelor's degree in 1968, jointly from the State University of New York College of Environmental Science and Forestry (SUNY ESF) and from Syracuse University. She was the first woman to graduate from the SUNY ESF program in polymer chemistry.

She came to work for IBM as an electronics packaging engineer, and continued there for 39 years, finishing her career as senior location executive for IBM's research facility in Endicott, New York. As director of environmentally conscious products for IBM, she led the incorporation of recycled materials into IBM personal computers; she also worked on a program to recycle old computers, led an IBM taskforce on environmental leadership, and pushed IBM to donate land to environmental organizations and to participate in eco-industrial parks. She also founded the IEEE Technical Committee on Electronics and the Environment, the IEEE International Symposium on Electronics and the Environment, and the Electronics Recycling Summit.

While still at IBM, Bendz worked with Joan L. Mitchell and others in an IBM program aimed at promoting engineering to middle school girls. After retiring, she founded and ran Girls Balance the Equation, a nonprofit organization with similar goals.

== Recognition ==
In 1984, the IEEE gave Bendz their Centennial Key-to-the-Future Award. She is also a recipient of the IEEE Third Millennium Medal, and of the Environmental Progress Individual Award of the Environmental Issues Council of the Electronic Industries Association. Bendz was named a Fellow of the IEEE in 1997, "for leadership and contributions to electronics manufacturing and to environmental impact and policy".

In 2015, SUNY ESF gave her their Graduates of Distinction Lifetime Achievement Award.
