= Wanakena, New York =

Hamlet in New York, United States

Coordinates: 44°7′59″N 74°55′18″W

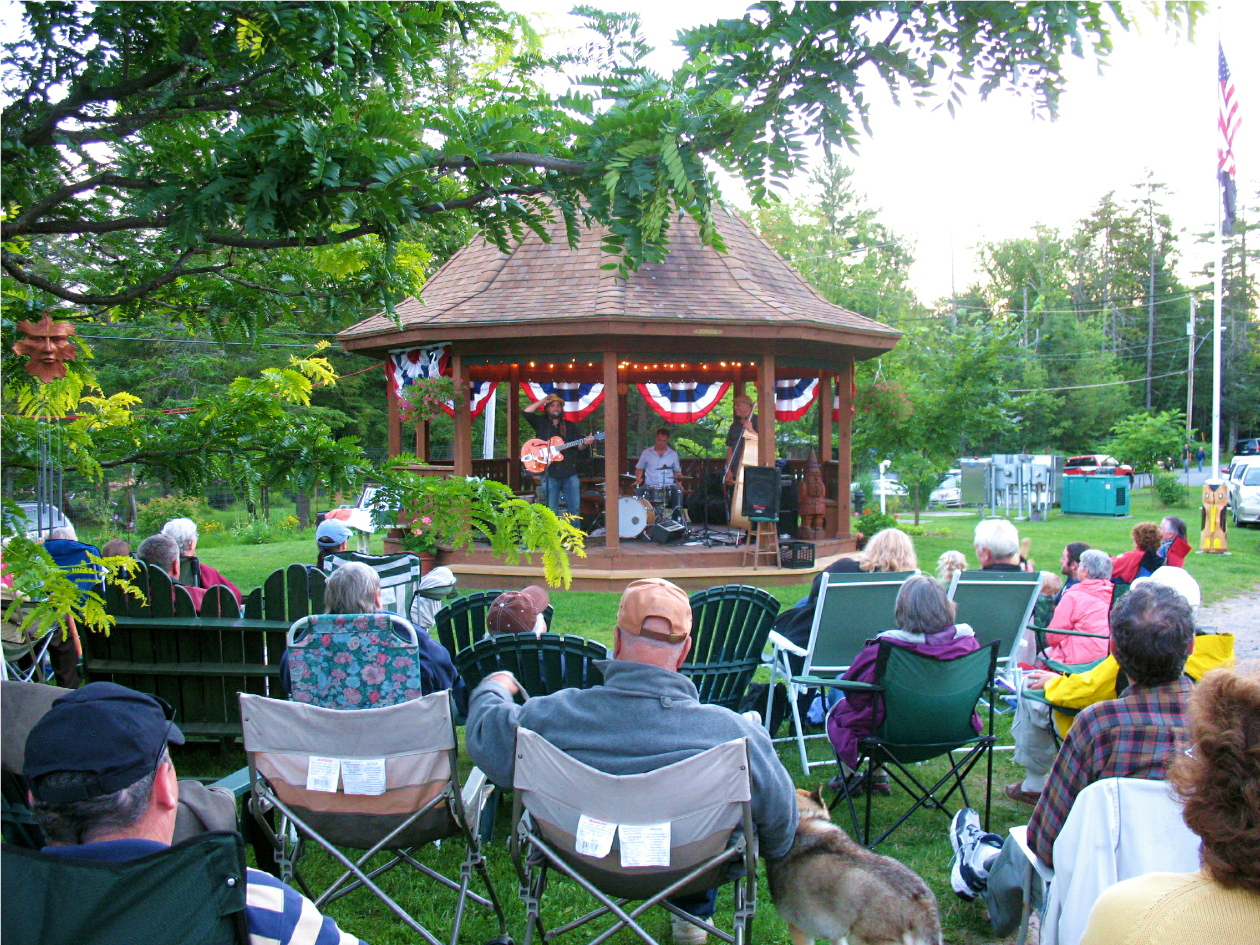
Summer concert at the gazebo in Wanakena

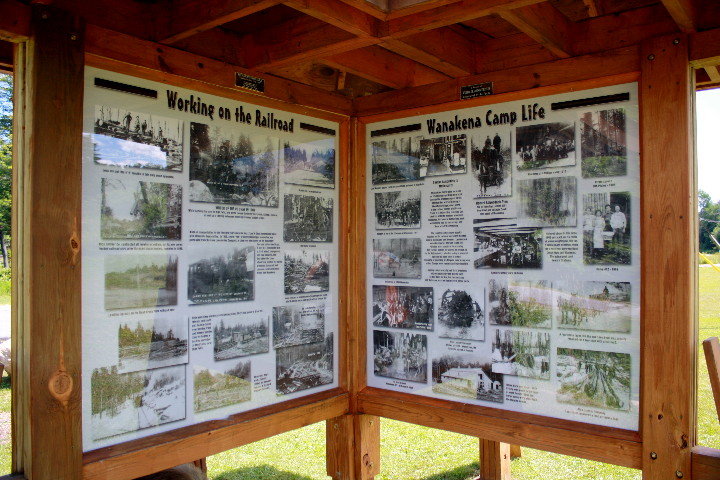
Walking tour kiosk on North Shore in Wanakena

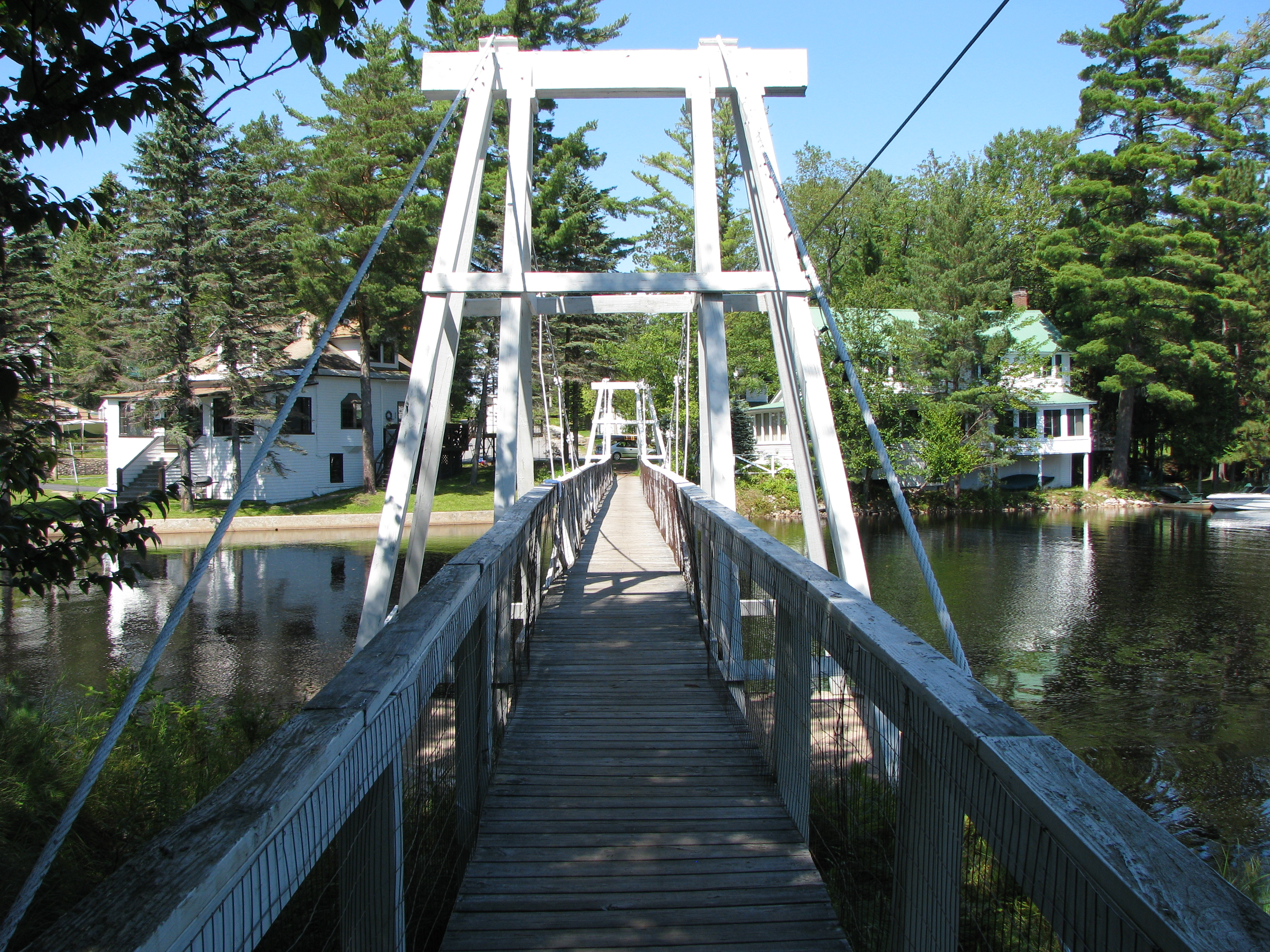
The Wanakena Footbridge over the Oswegatchie River

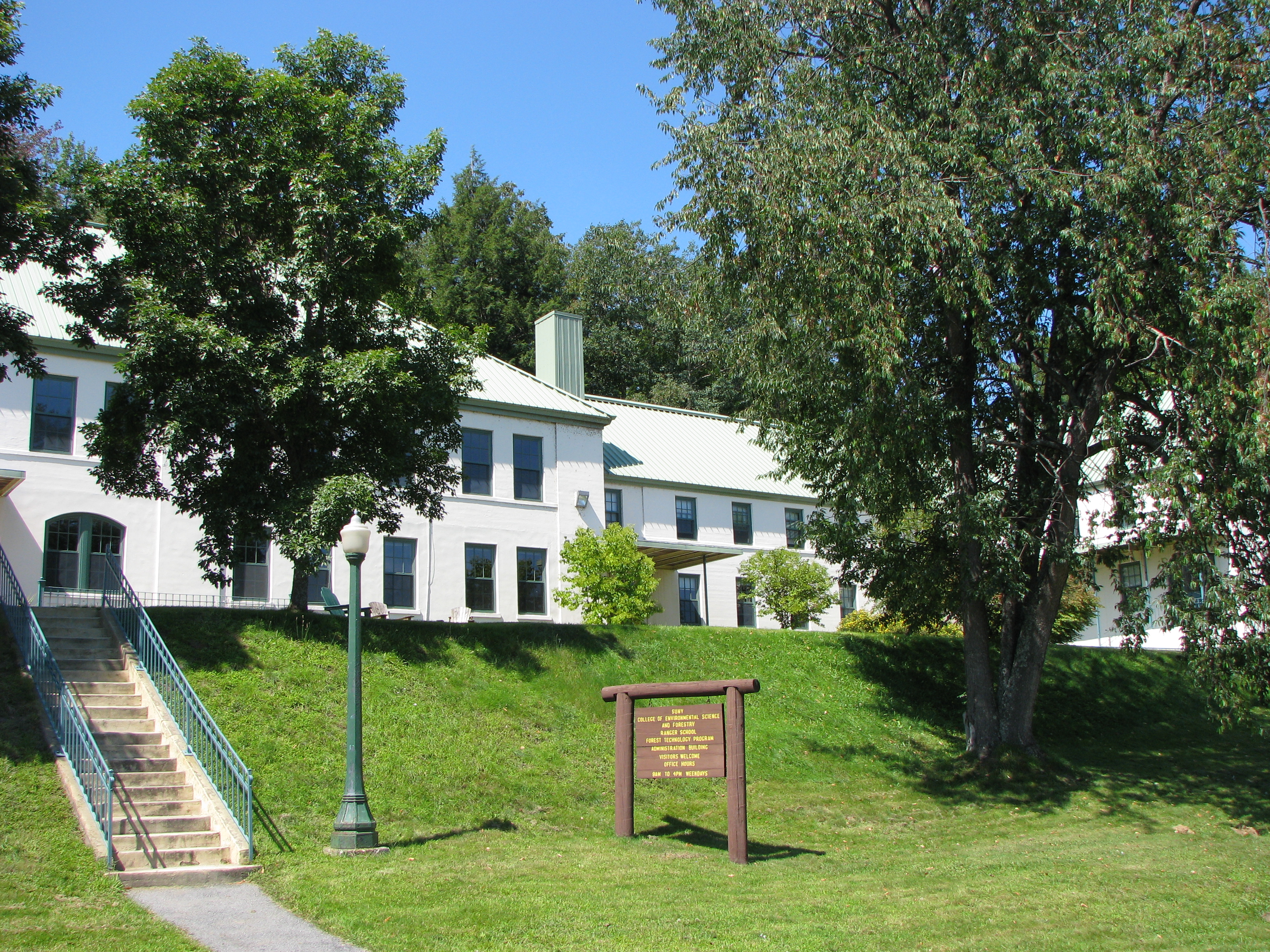
The Ranger School

Wanakena is a hamlet located on the shore of Cranberry Lake in the town of Fine in St. Lawrence County, New York, United States. Tourism is a major industry in the area; a small year-round population is supplemented by an influx seasonal residents each summer. It is the location of the SUNY-ESF Ranger School.

== Climate ==
Climate data for Wanakena, New York, 1991–2020 normals, 1910-2020 extremes: 1510ft (460m)
| Month | Jan | Feb | Mar | Apr | May | Jun | Jul | Aug | Sep | Oct | Nov | Dec | Year |
|---|---|---|---|---|---|---|---|---|---|---|---|---|---|
| Record high °F (°C) | 62 (17) | 62 (17) | 77 (25) | 89 (32) | 94 (34) | 100 (38) | 100 (38) | 95 (35) | 93 (34) | 85 (29) | 73 (23) | 64 (18) | 100 (38) |
| Mean maximum °F (°C) | 47 (8) | 48 (9) | 59 (15) | 74 (23) | 82 (28) | 86 (30) | 87 (31) | 86 (30) | 82 (28) | 75 (24) | 63 (17) | 50 (10) | 89 (32) |
| Mean daily maximum °F (°C) | 29.1 (−1.6) | 31.2 (−0.4) | 39.9 (4.4) | 53.7 (12.1) | 67.1 (19.5) | 75.7 (24.3) | 79.3 (26.3) | 77.8 (25.4) | 71.1 (21.7) | 57.3 (14.1) | 45.0 (7.2) | 33.5 (0.8) | 55.1 (12.8) |
| Daily mean °F (°C) | 16.9 (−8.4) | 18.2 (−7.7) | 26.6 (−3.0) | 41.8 (5.4) | 54.3 (12.4) | 63.1 (17.3) | 67.1 (19.5) | 65.8 (18.8) | 58.8 (14.9) | 46.4 (8.0) | 34.8 (1.6) | 23.8 (−4.6) | 43.1 (6.2) |
| Mean daily minimum °F (°C) | 4.6 (−15.2) | 5.3 (−14.8) | 13.3 (−10.4) | 30.0 (−1.1) | 41.4 (5.2) | 50.4 (10.2) | 54.9 (12.7) | 53.9 (12.2) | 46.4 (8.0) | 35.6 (2.0) | 24.7 (−4.1) | 14.2 (−9.9) | 31.2 (−0.4) |
| Mean minimum °F (°C) | −27 (−33) | −25 (−32) | −14 (−26) | 9 (−13) | 25 (−4) | 33 (1) | 40 (4) | 37 (3) | 28 (−2) | 18 (−8) | 3 (−16) | −20 (−29) | −31 (−35) |
| Record low °F (°C) | −41 (−41) | −45 (−43) | −33 (−36) | −17 (−27) | 16 (−9) | 24 (−4) | 34 (1) | 30 (−1) | 21 (−6) | 6 (−14) | −19 (−28) | −43 (−42) | −45 (−43) |
| Average precipitation inches (mm) | 3.05 (77) | 2.50 (64) | 2.83 (72) | 3.18 (81) | 3.67 (93) | 4.15 (105) | 4.69 (119) | 3.72 (94) | 4.30 (109) | 4.49 (114) | 3.59 (91) | 2.95 (75) | 43.12 (1,094) |
| Average snowfall inches (cm) | 28.6 (73) | 26.7 (68) | 18.2 (46) | 6.0 (15) | 0.3 (0.76) | 0.0 (0.0) | 0.0 (0.0) | 0.0 (0.0) | 0.0 (0.0) | 1.9 (4.8) | 10.3 (26) | 24.0 (61) | 116 (294.56) |
Source 1: NOAA
Source 2: XMACIS (snowfall, records & monthly max/mins)

== History ==
The town was founded in 1902 by cousins Herbert and Horace Rich, founders of the Rich Lumber Company. Rich Lumber purchased 16,000 acres (65 km^{2}) on the southwestern shore of Cranberry Lake, and constructed several mills to work the lumber. Housing for the millworkers was built in part from lumber salvaged from the company's abandoned Pennsylvania lumber operation with many of these homes still in existence. At the height of lumbering & milling activities in Wanakena (1902–1912) there were up to 1500 workers at the Wanakena mills and associated industries. Prior to leaving the deforested area, Rich Lumber Company donated land to Syracuse University to start the first school in the nation to educate forest rangers and to encourage sustainable forestry practices with the first school built in 1912. The Environmental School of Forestry is now part of SUNY and is the oldest Ranger School / School of Forestry in the country.

A passenger and freight railroad was constructed connecting Wanakena to the Carthage and Adirondack Railroad at Benson Mines, starting operation in 1903. There were many more miles of this railroad extending into the forest. After the lumber industry left the area, the rails were dismantled because of a significant decrease in people traveling to and from Wanakena.

A suspension footbridge built over the Oswegatchie River connected the hamlet and the mills for company workers and was one of the longest suspension foot bridges in the United States. The footbridge had been listed on the National Register of Historic Places prior to being destroyed by an ice jam on January 14, 2014. Community efforts began immediately to rebuild the bridge with over $130,000 raised as of May 2016. Several grants and donations by local Foundations were used with the donated money for a matching grant from the New York State Office of Parks, Recreation and Historic Places. Reconstruction of the bridge was completed in November 2016. The new footbridge is, of course, not listed on the National Register. The Wanakena Presbyterian Church is also listed on the National Register of Historic Places.

The Wanakena Historical Association developed a historical walking tour (2002) that includes two kiosks and six picture stations that display historical pictures and narratives on the history of the hamlet, logging, milling, railroad, and tourism. The walking tour is visited annually by schools, bus tours and tourists. The walking tour is free and open to the public from May 30 until at least Labor Day.

Today there is still a vibrant community within the town. In addition to the SUNY ESF school, there's a church with weekly services during the summer (9:15 am), a post-office, a store and art gallery called Otto's Abode, Packbasket Adventures Lodge and Guide Service, the Otto J Hamele Historic Walking Tour, and a gazebo where summer concerts are held. The Wanakena History Center opened in 2021, including the unveiling of a historic sign commemorating the founding of the Ranger School in 1912. The sign was paid for by a grant from the Pomeroy Foundation in Syracuse.

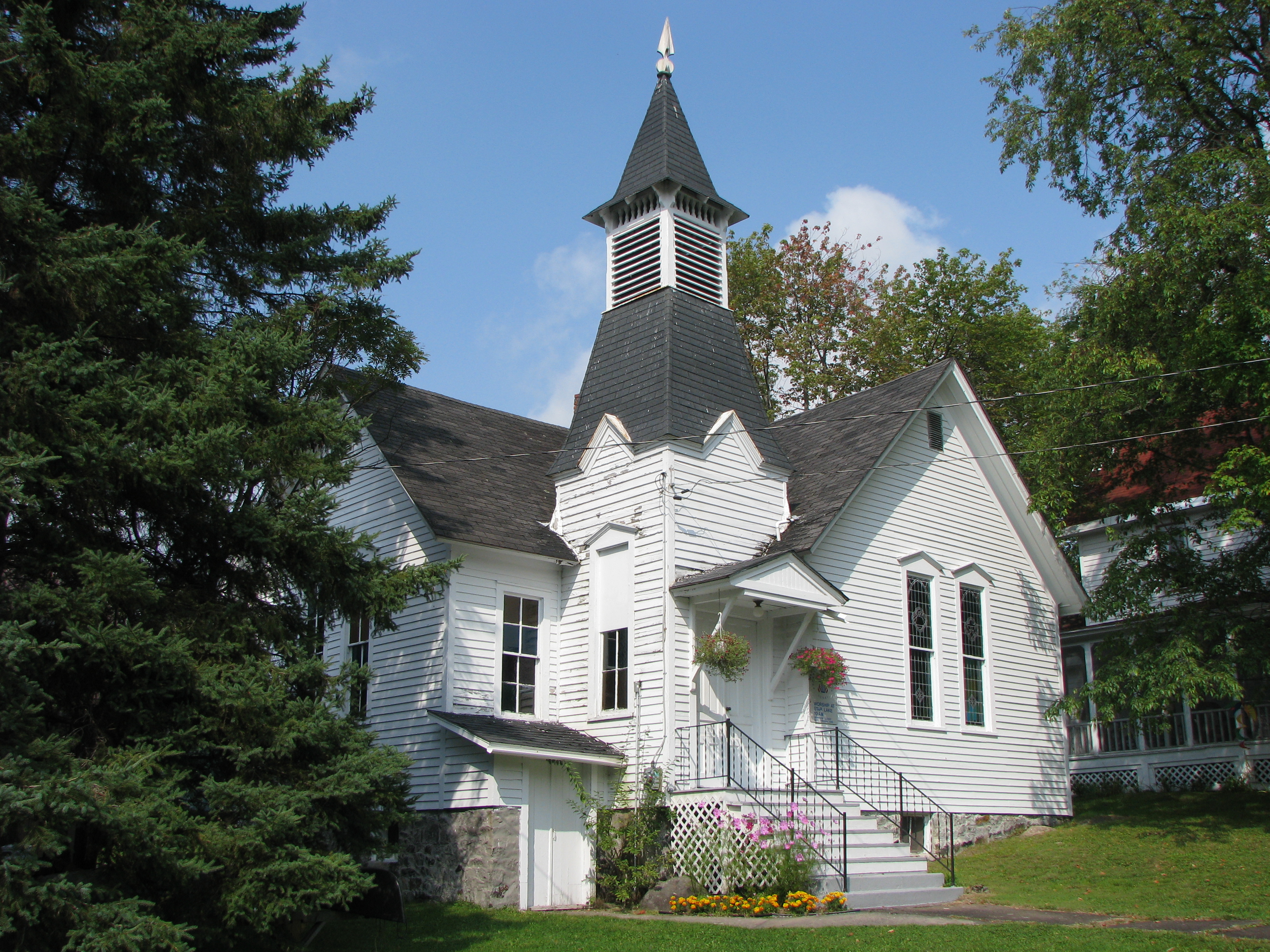
Western Adirondack Presbyterian Church

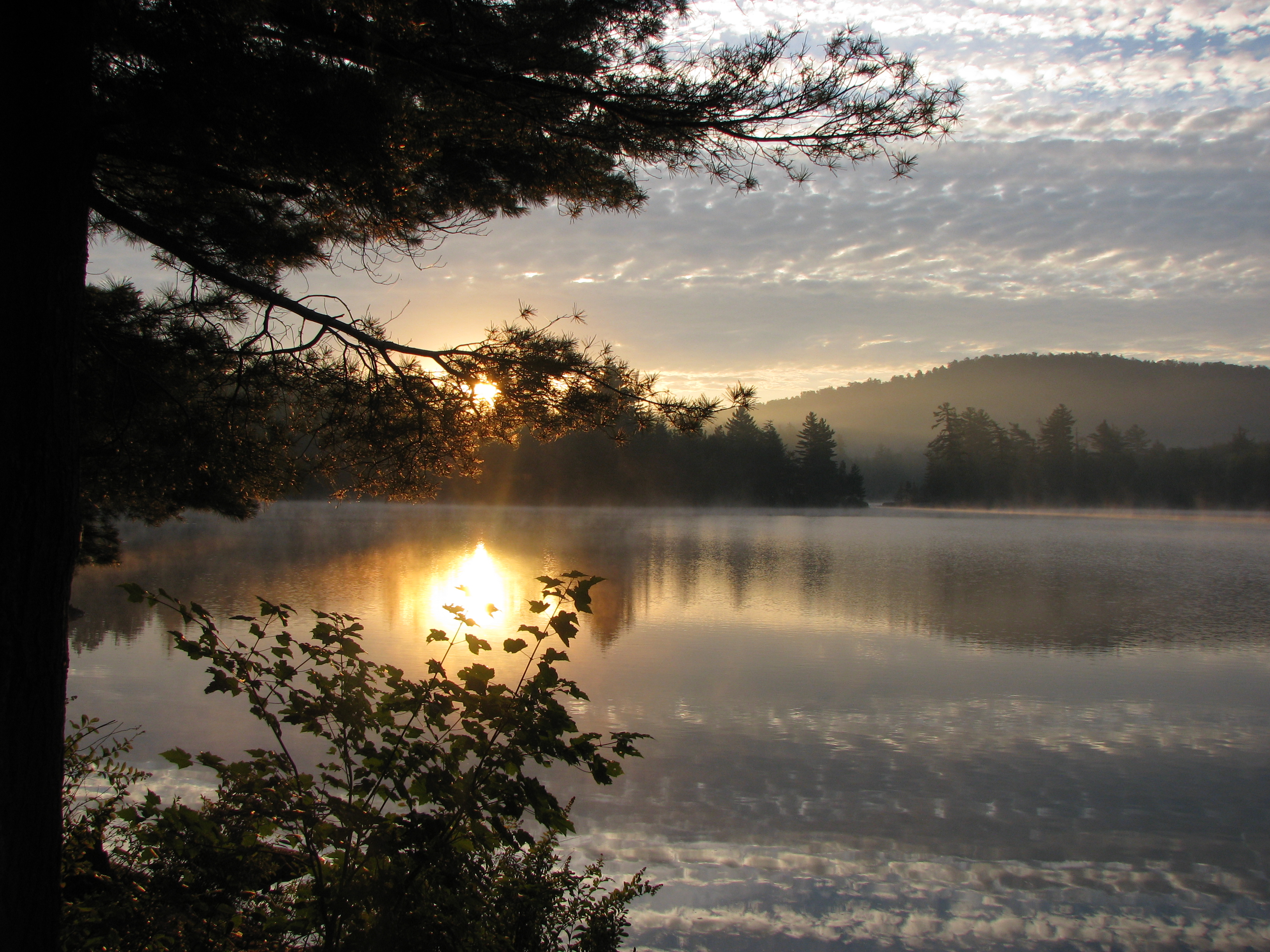
Cranberry Lake, Black Duck Hole
