= List of historic schools of forestry =

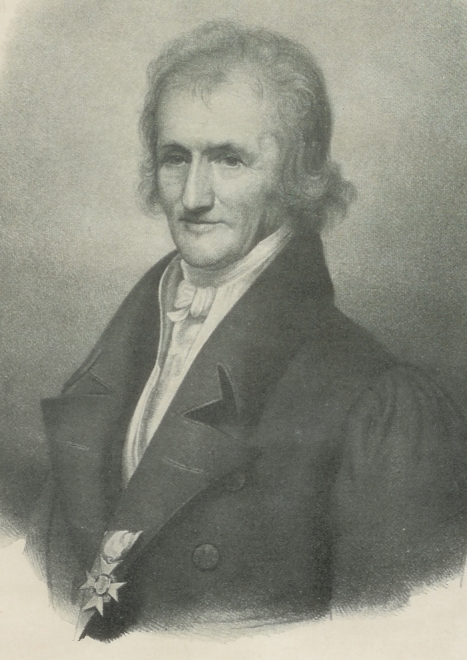
Heinrich von Cotta (1763-1844), "pioneer of scientific forestry"

This is a list of historic schools of forestry, by founding date. Also included is information about each school's location, founder(s), present status, and (where applicable) closing date. Many remain active.

== 1700s ==
- 1778 - A course of study in forestry formally added to the curriculum at the University of Giessen, Hesse-Darmstadt, Holy Roman Empire
- 1785 - Master school of forestry established by Heinrich von Cotta and his father, in Kleine Zillbach, near Wasungen, Thuringia
- 1787 or 1789 - Master school of forestry established at Hungen, Hesse, by Georg Ludwig Hartig; moved to Dillenburg, Hesse, 1797–1805; reestablished in Berlin; then, in 1830, moved to Eberswalde, about 30 km away (see below)
- 1790 - School of forestry established in Munich, Bavaria
- 1798 - Waldau Forest Institute (Forstlehranstalt zu Waldau) established by Friedrich Ludwig von Witzelben, in the Kassel district of Hesse, Germany; closed 1815

== 1800-1849 ==
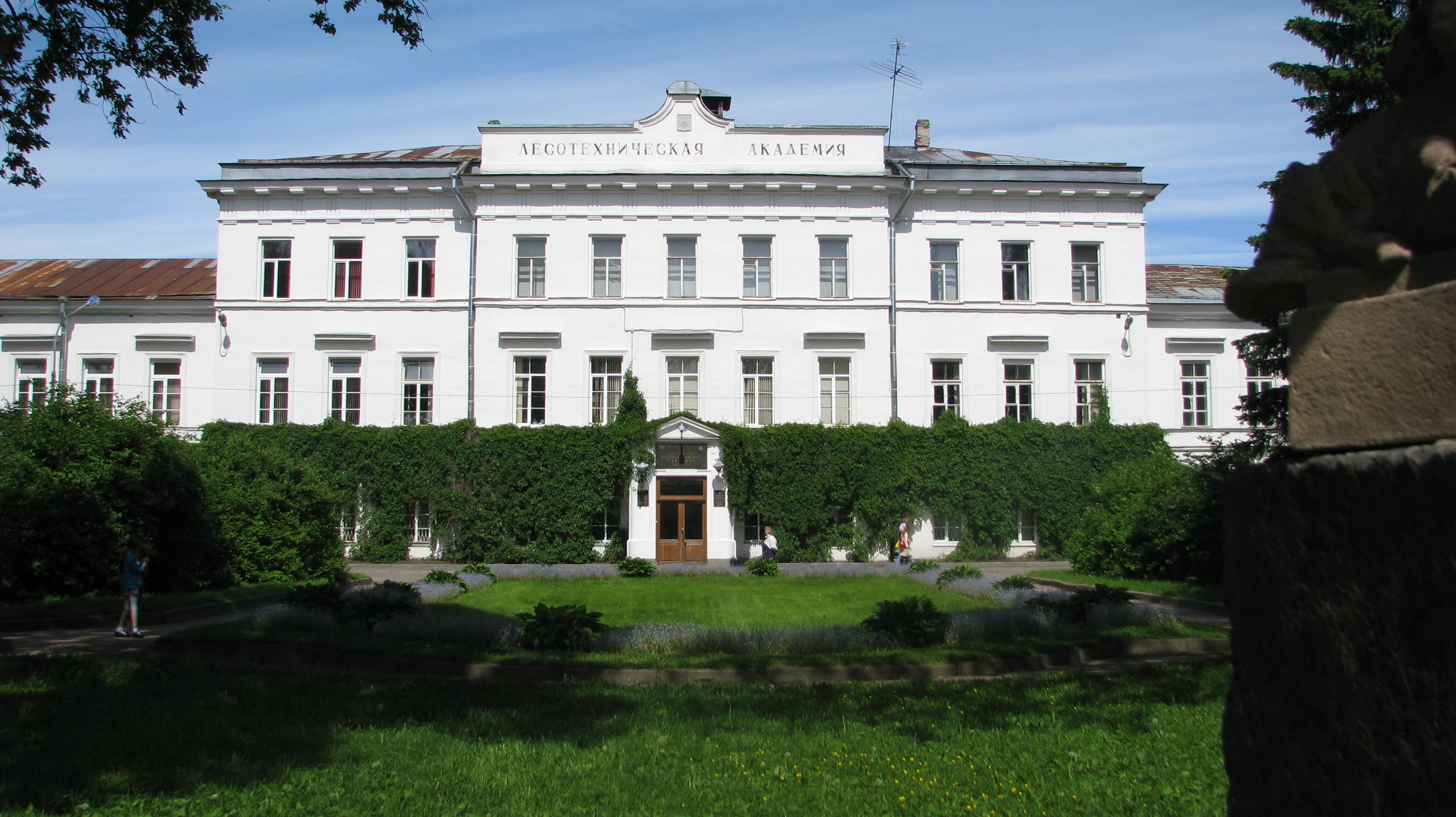
Saint Petersburg Forestry Academy

- 1800 - First formal training of foresters in Russia; 'forstmeister' course established at the Naval Cadet Corps Academy, Saint Petersburg
- 1803 - Royal Forestry School (or 'Practical Forestry School'), in Tsarskoye Selo (near Saint Petersburg), Russia; in 1811, moved to Saint Petersburg to become the Imperial Forestry Institute, later the S. M. Kirov Forestry Academy; today the Saint Petersburg State Forestry University.
- 1807 - Royal Bavarian Central Forestry Academy, Aschaffenburg, Bavaria; merged with LMU Munich in 1874

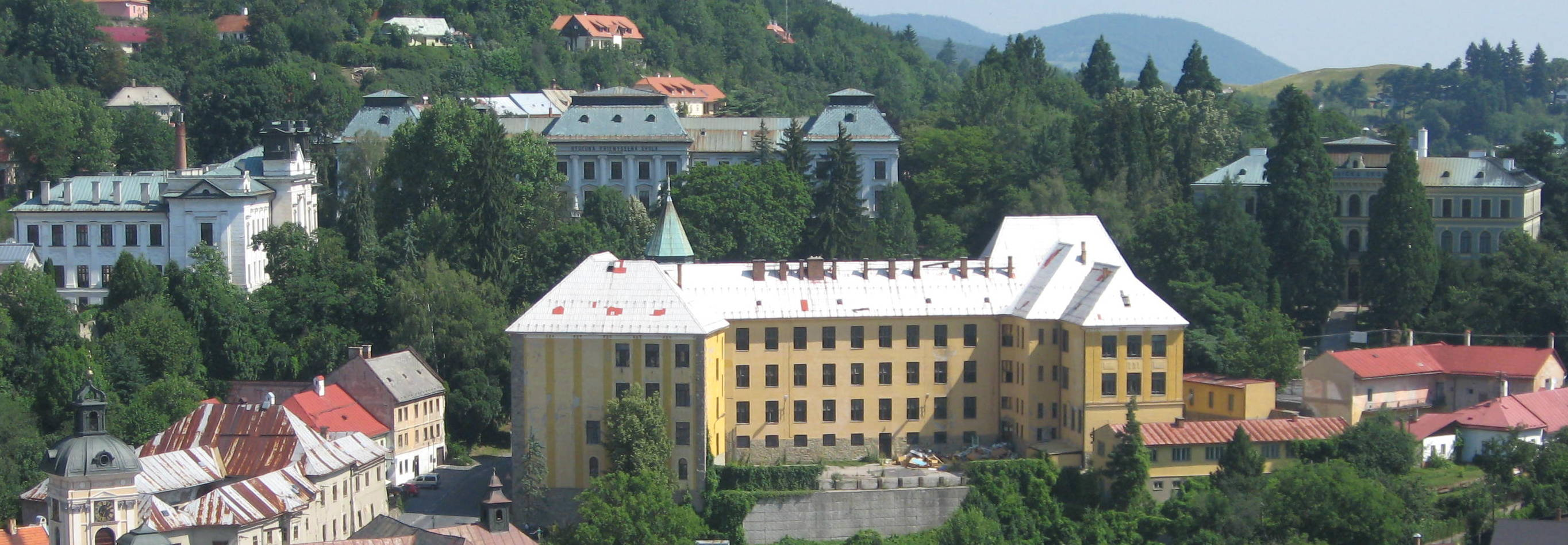
Former Academy of Mining and Forestry, Banská Štiavnica, Slovakia

- 1807 - Forestry Institute, Academy of Mining, Schemnitz, Austria-Hungary (now Banská Štiavnica, Slovakia; Heinrich David Wilckens, founder); became the Academy of Mining and Forestry, 1848 (Ignaz Schwarz Friedrich, founder); moved to Sopron, Hungary, in 1919; continues today as the University of West Hungary.
- 1811 - Royal Saxon Academy of Forestry, Tharandt, Saxony (Heinrich von Cotta, founder); now part of Dresden University of Technology, Germany
- 1811 - Royal Swedish Academy of Agriculture and Forestry, Stockholm (Karl XIV Johan, founder)
- 1813 - Imperial Academy of Forestry, at the Mariabrunn monastery, near Vienna, Austria
- 1824 - French National School of Forestry (École nationale des eaux et forêts, or 'Imperial Forestry School'), Nancy, France; today part of AgroParisTech

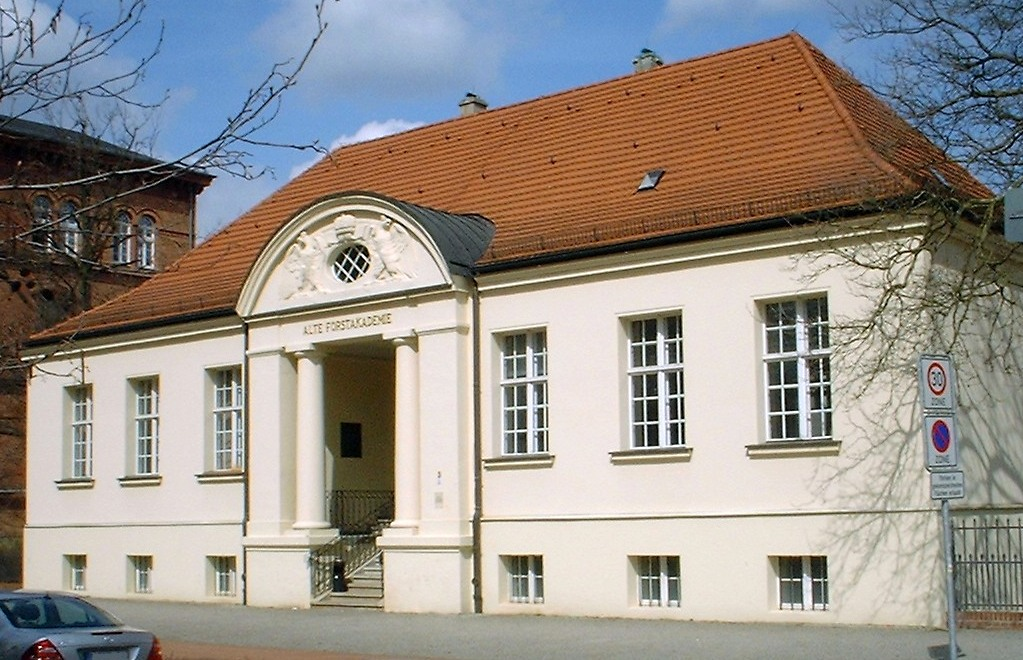
Eberswalde Forestry Academy

- 1830 - Royal Prussian Higher Forestry College established in Eberswalde; later affiliated as a faculty of the University of Berlin; the International Union of Forest Experiment Stations, predecessor of the International Union of Forest Research Organizations, was established there on August 17, 1892.
- 1844 - Escuela Técnica Superior de Ingenieros de Montes, Madrid, Spain, continuing today in the Technical University of Madrid
- 1848 - School of forestry established at Turin, Italy

== 1850-1899 ==
- 1860 - Royal Agriculture and Forestry College, Križevci, Croatia; today the College of Agriculture at Križevci
- 1868 - Faculty of Forest Sciences and Forest Ecology, University of Göttingen, Lower Saxony, Germany; successor to the Royal Prussian Academy of Forestry at Münden
- 1870 - Forest Institute of Vallombrosa, Italy, established on the German model
- 1875 - Forestry program established at the University of Agriculture in Vienna, Austria, incorporating the former Imperial Academy of Forestry at Mariabrunn
- 1878 - Imperial Forest School, Dehradun, India (founded by Dietrich Brandis, for the British Imperial Forestry Service); today, incorporated into the Indian Forest Research Institute, Dehradun

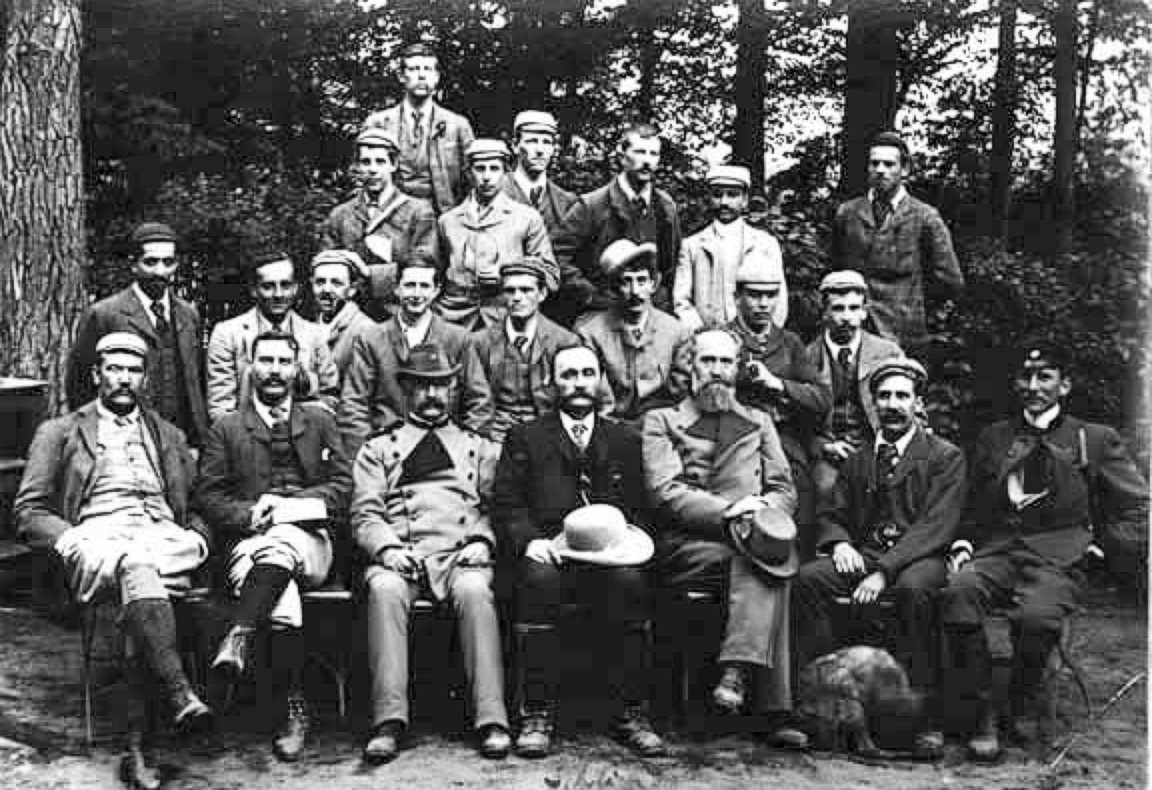
Sir William Schlich, Carl Schenck, and others, Saxony 1892

- 1885 - Royal Indian Engineering College (also known informally as the 'Cooper's Hill School of Forestry'), Surrey, England (William Schlich, founder); closed 1905
- 1897 - Forestry programs included in the Faculty of Agriculture, in the newly established Kyoto Imperial University, now Kyoto University, Japan
- 1898, September 1 - Biltmore Forest School, Asheville, North Carolina, USA (Carl A. Schenck, founder); closed 1913
- 1898, September 22 or 23 - New York State College of Forestry at Cornell, Ithaca, NY, USA (Bernhard Fernow, founding dean); closed June 1903
- 1898, October 20 - Academy of Forestry established at the University of Zagreb, Croatia

== 1900-1949 ==
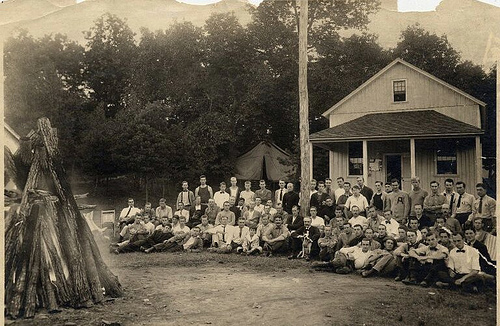
Gifford Pinchot and students at the Yale summer forestry camp, Milford, Pennsylvania, 1910

- 1900 - Yale School of Forestry, New Haven, Connecticut, USA (Gifford Pinchot, founder; Henry S. Graves, founding dean)
- 1902 - Agriculture and Forestry School, Shanxi Province, China
- 1903 - Forestry department, Imperial University of Peking, China
- 1903, May - Pennsylvania State Forest Academy, Mont Alto, PA (Joseph Rothrock, MD, founder; George Wirt, founding administrator); merged with the Pennsylvania State University to become Penn State Mont Alto
- 1904 - Department of Horticulture and Forestry, Iowa State College (now Iowa State University), Ames, Iowa USA; First forestry course 1877, department established 1877, forestry curriculum approved 1904. Forestry program continues to offer B.S., M.S., and Ph.D. degrees within the Department of Natural Resource Ecology and Management.
- 1904 - Forestry department, Zhili Higher Agricultural School, Hebei Province, China; in 1952, the department was separated into several universities, with most faculty going into the Beijing Forestry University
- 1905 - School of Forestry, Oxford University, England (Sir William Schlich, founder)
- 1906 - School of Forestry, University of Georgia, (George Foster Peabody, founder; Alfred A. Akerman, founding dean)
- 1906 - South African Forestry School, Tokai, Cape Town, South Africa (Joseph Storr Lister, founder)
- 1907 - Faculty of Forestry, University of Toronto, Canada (Bernhard Fernow, founding dean)
- 1907 - School of Forestry, University of Washington, Seattle, WA (Francis Miller, first dean)
- 1908 - Ranger School, University of Montana
- 1910, April 19 - Forest School established within the College of Agriculture at the University of the Philippines Los Baños, Royal F. Nash, founding "Officer-in-Charge"; today the College of Forestry and Natural Resources
- 1910 - Victorian School of Forestry (VSF), Creswick, Australia.
- 1911 - New York State College of Forestry at Syracuse University, Syracuse, NY, USA; (Louis Marshall, founder; William L. Bray, founding dean); now part of the State University of New York system

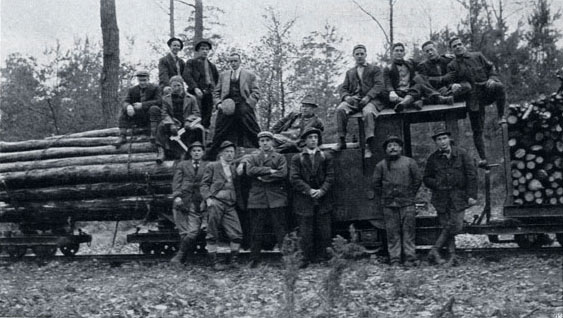
Students from the Biltmore Forest School (USA), visiting Darmstadt, Germany, 1912

- 1912 - Madras Forest Academy, Coimbatore, Tamil Nadu, South India
- 1913 - School of Forestry, University of Montana. Established by the 12th Legislature of Montana.
- 1919 - Moscow Forest Engineering Institute, Russia's "first higher education institution for training forest engineers"; now Moscow State Forest University
- 1920 - Faculty of Forestry, University of Belgrade, Serbia. Studies in the field of forestry began in 1920 as the Department of Forestry at the Agricultural Faculty in Belgrade. The Faculty of Forestry became separate in 1949, the first independent forestry faculty in the former Yugoslavia.
- 1926 - Australian Forestry School, Canberra, Australia. Foundation Principal Charles Lane Poole. Became part of the Australian National University in 1965.
- 1932 - Saasveld Forestry College, George, South Africa; now part of Nelson Mandela Metropolitan University (NMMU)
- 1948, June 16 - Forestry Specialist School, Shanxi Province, China (established by the Chinese Communist Party)

== 1950-present ==
- 1951 - University of British Columbia, Vancouver, British Columbia, established its Faculty of Forestry. The school would absorb students from Hungary's Sopron School in 1957.
- 1952 - Beijing Forestry University, China, with faculty from Tsinghua University, Peking University, and the Beijing Agricultural University
- 1962 - Forestry school established in Viçosa, Minas Gerais, Brazil, with support from the United Nations Development Program, the Food and Agriculture Organization, and the Government of Brazil; moved the next year to become a faculty of the Federal University of Paraná, in Curitiba.
- 1976 - Institute of Forestry established in the Faculty of Science, University of Chittagong, Bangladesh, with help of Ministry of Environment and Forest and Bangladesh Forest Department. It is the pioneer institution of the country which initiated Professional Master of Forestry in 1977–78; 4-year B.Sc. (Hons.) in Forestry in 1978–79; M.Sc. in Forestry in 1996; B.Sc. (Hons.) in Environmental Science in 2000–2001; and M.Sc. in Environmental Science in 2004. Renamed as the Institute of Forestry and Environmental Sciences, CU (IFESCU), July 1996.

== See also ==
- List of forest research institutes
- List of forestry technical schools
- List of forestry universities and colleges
- List of historic journals of forestry
- Imperial Forestry Institute (disambiguation)
