= Wilhelm-Günther Vahrson =

German geographer and academic (born 1955)

Wilhelm-Gunther Vahrson
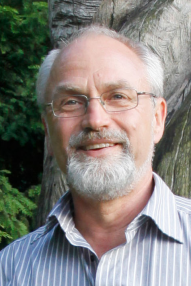
- Prof. Wilhelm-Günther Vahrson (2012)

Wilhelm-Günther Vahrson (born May 1955, Iserlohn) is a German geographer and academic. Since 1997 he has been the president of the Hochschule für nachhaltige Entwicklung Eberswalde.
