= List of forestry technical schools =

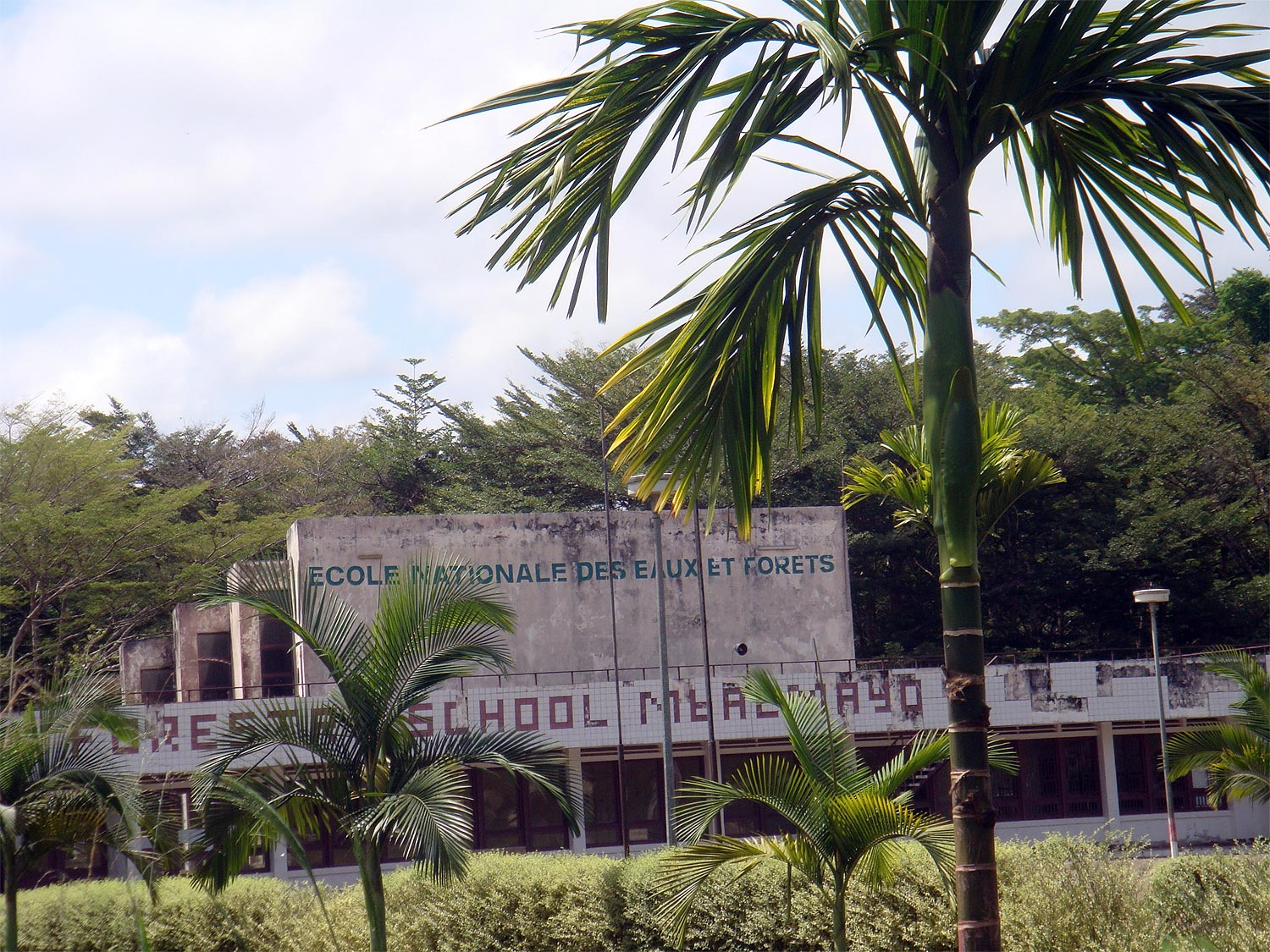
Mbalmayo National Forestry School, Mbalmayo, Cameroon

(For higher educational institutions offering bachelor's, master's or doctoral degrees in forestry and related fields see: List of forestry universities and colleges.)

This is a list of notable secondary, tertiary, technical schools, and practical training institutes around the world offering one- or two-year forestry technician degrees, along with related diplomas or certificates, grouped by continent and country.

== Africa ==
=== Mali ===
- Forestry Practical Training Centre of Tabakoro (CFPF)

=== Nigeria ===
- Audu Bako School of Agriculture

=== Tunisia ===
- Sylvo-Pastoral Institute of Tabarka, University of Jendouba

=== Zambia ===
- Zambia Forestry College

== Americas ==
=== Bolivia ===
- Technical School of Forestry, Universidad Mayor de San Simón

=== Canada ===
- Forest Technology Program, Maritime College of Forest Technology, New Brunswick
- Forest Technology Program, Northern Alberta Institute of Technology (NAIT)
- Forestry Resources Technology Programme, Vancouver Island University, British Columbia

=== United States ===
(alphabetized by state)

- Reedley College, Reedley, California
- Colorado State University, Fort Collins, Colorado
- Abraham Baldwin Agricultural College, Tifton, Georgia
- University of Maine at Fort Kent, Fort Kent, Maine
- Allegany College of Maryland, Cumberland, Maryland
- Itasca Community College, Grand Rapids, Minnesota
- Vermilion Community College, Ely, Minnesota
- Thompson School, University of New Hampshire, Durham, New Hampshire
- Paul Smith's College, Paul Smiths, New York

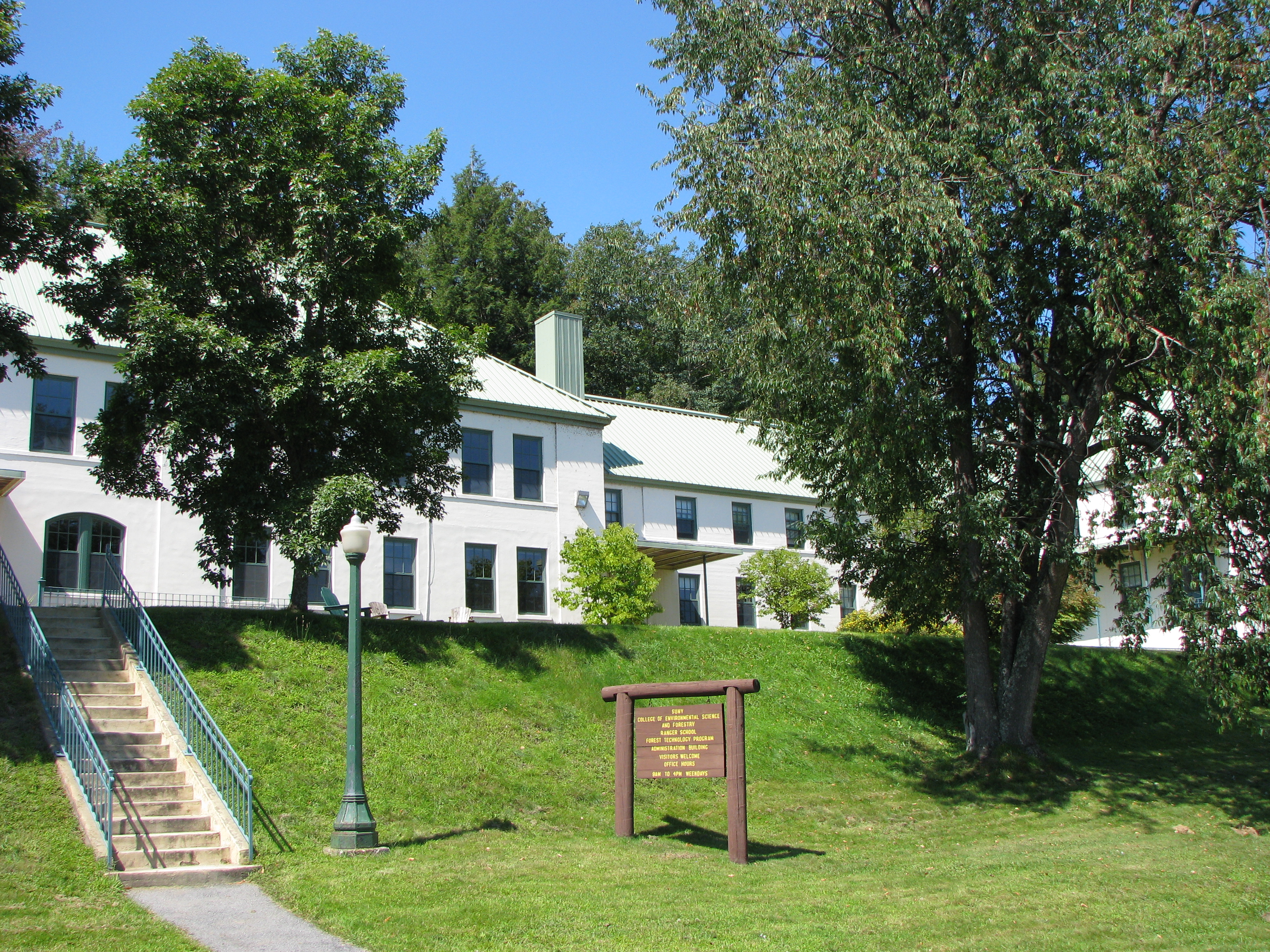
SUNY-ESF Ranger School, Wanakena, New York

- SUNY-ESF Ranger School, Wanakena, New York
- SUNY Morrisville (College of Agriculture and Technology), Morrisville, New York
- Haywood Community College, Clyde, North Carolina
- Montgomery Community College, Troy, North Carolina
- Southeastern Community College, Whiteville, North Carolina
- Hocking College, Nelsonville, Ohio
- Eastern Oklahoma State College, Wilburton, Oklahoma
- Central Oregon Community College, Bend, Oregon
- Mt. Hood Community College, Gresham, Oregon
- Penn State Mont Alto, Mont Alto, Pennsylvania
- Pennsylvania College of Technology, Williamsport, Pennsylvania
- Horry-Georgetown Technical College, Conway, South Carolina
- Dabney S. Lancaster Community College, Clifton Forge, Virginia
- Green River Community College, Auburn, Washington
- Spokane Community College, Spokane, Washington
- Glenville State University, Glenville, West Virginia

== Asia ==
=== India ===
- Indira Gandhi National Forest Academy, Dehradun
- Indian Council of Forestry Research and Education, Dehradun

== Europe ==
=== Austria ===
- Technical Forestry High School (https://www.forstschule.at/en/) HBLA Bruck an der Mur

=== France ===
- École supérieure du bois (ESB), Nantes
- Centre Forestier de la région Provence-Alpes-Côte d'Azur, La Bastide des Jourdans, Vaucluse

=== Hungary ===
- Kiss Ferenc Technical School of Forestry (in Hungarian) Szeged, Hungary
- Roth Gyula Technical School of Forestry Sopron, Hungary

=== Latvia ===
- Ogre Technical School

=== Ukraine ===
- Carpathian Forestry College
- Lubny Forest Engineering College

=== United Kingdom ===
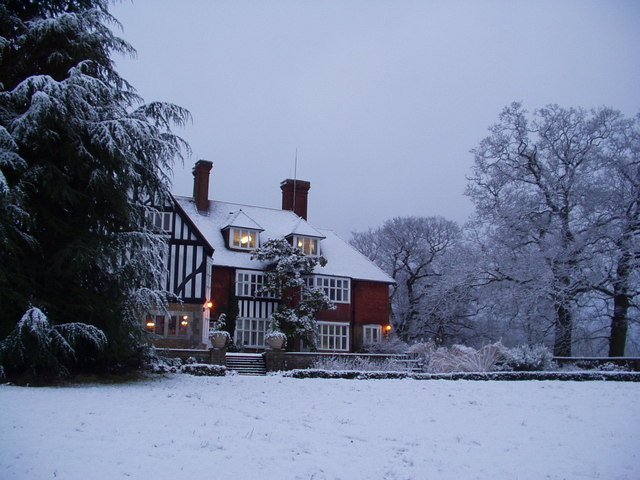
Merrist Wood College, United Kingdom

- Herefordshire College of Technology
- Merrist Wood College, Guildford College of Further and Higher Education
- Scotland's Rural College, Barony Campus
- Scottish School of Forestry, Inverness College
- Sparsholt College Hampshire

== See also ==
- List of historic schools of forestry
- Lists of schools
