= Imperial Forestry Institute (disambiguation) =

Imperial Forestry Institute may refer to:

- Imperial Forestry Institute (UK), Oxford; incorporated into the Department of Plant Sciences, University of Oxford
- Imperial Forestry Institute (Japan), in the Faculty of Agriculture, Kyoto Imperial University, now Kyoto University
- Imperial Forestry Institute (Russia), Saint Petersburg, later the S. M. Kirov Forestry Academy; today the Saint Petersburg State Forestry University

It may also refer to:

- Imperial Academy of Forestry (Austria), Mariabrunn; incorporated into the University of Natural Resources and Life Sciences, Vienna
- Imperial Forestry School (France), Nancy, France, also known as the French National School of Forestry (École nationale des eaux et forêts); today part of AgroParisTech
- Imperial Forestry School (India), Dehradun, India; incorporated into the Forest Research Institute, Dehradun
- Forestry Department, Imperial University of Peking; incorporated into the Beijing Forestry University, China

== See also ==
- List of historic schools of forestry
