= Saasveld Forestry College =

Coordinates: 33°57′38″S 22°32′04″E

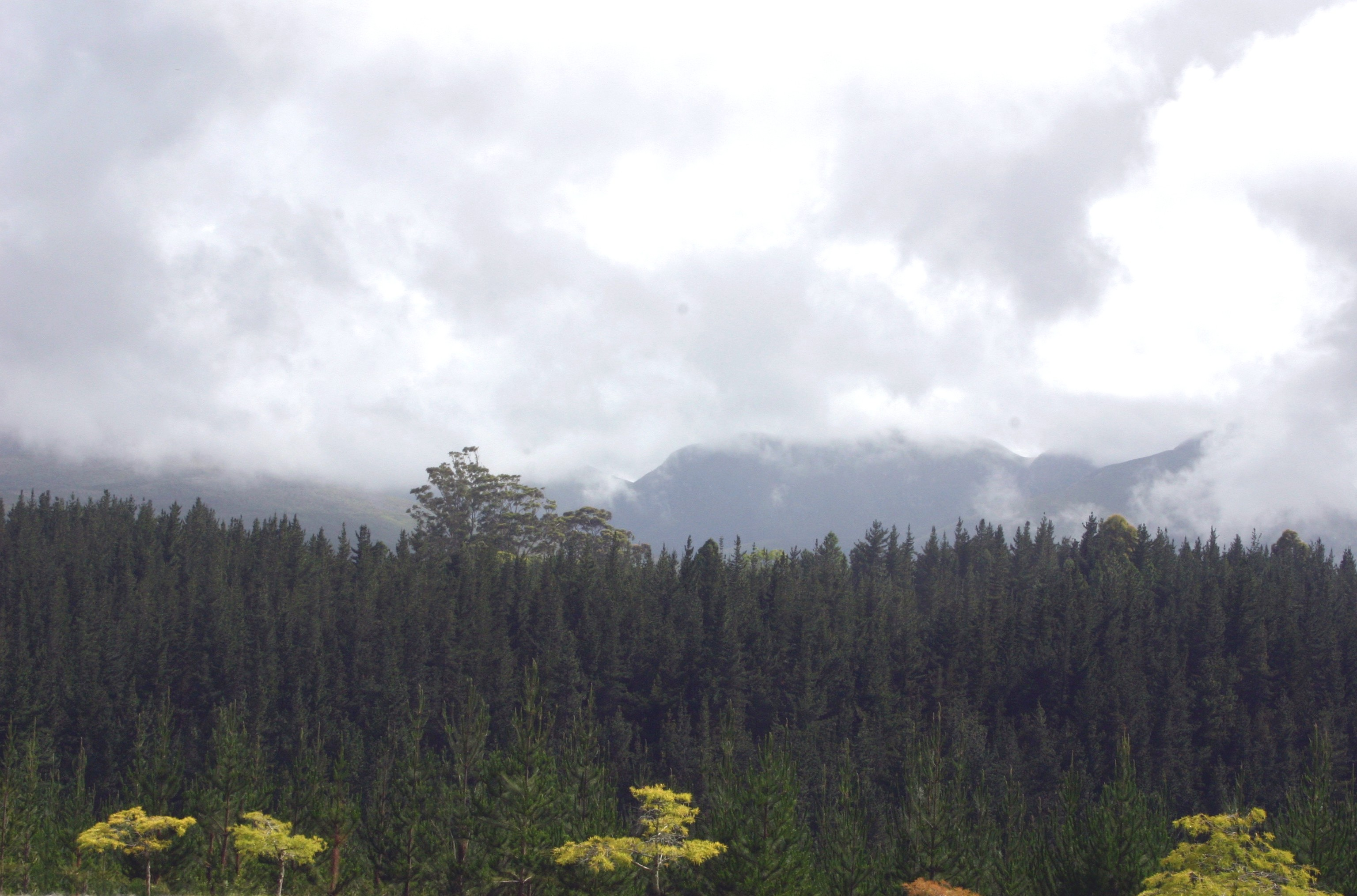
View from Saasveld to Outeniqua Mountains 4 January 2007

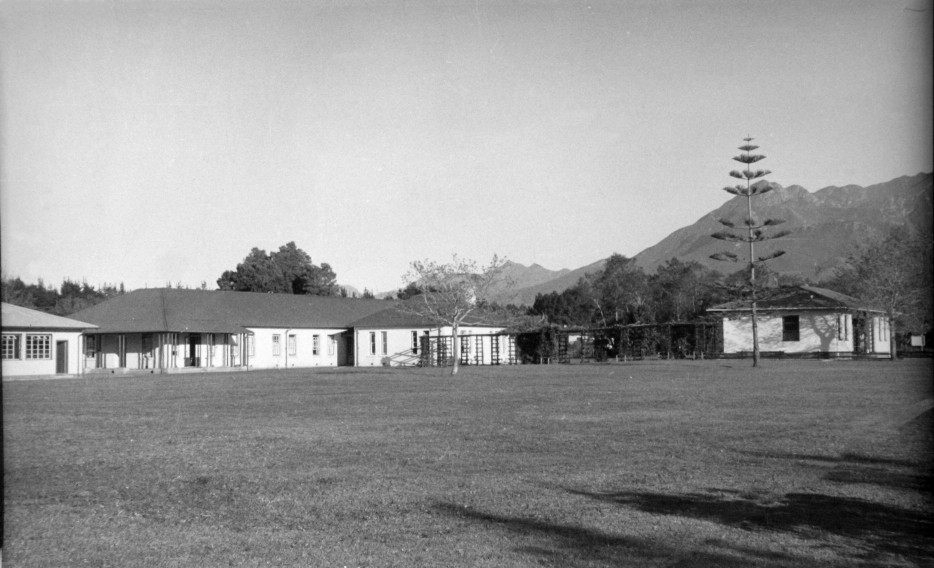
Saasveld Forestry College in 1957

Saasveld Forestry College is a South African college for the training of foresters, situated on the Garden Route in the Western Cape between George and Knysna. Before moving to its present location in 1932, it was located at Tokai, Cape Town.

Built on a rise between the Outeniqua Mountains and the Indian Ocean, the college commands sweeping views of fynbos-covered mountains and indigenous high forest. Between 1932 and 1985, it trained about 1300 foresters who were subsequently employed by the State and private companies such as Mondi and Sappi.

== History ==
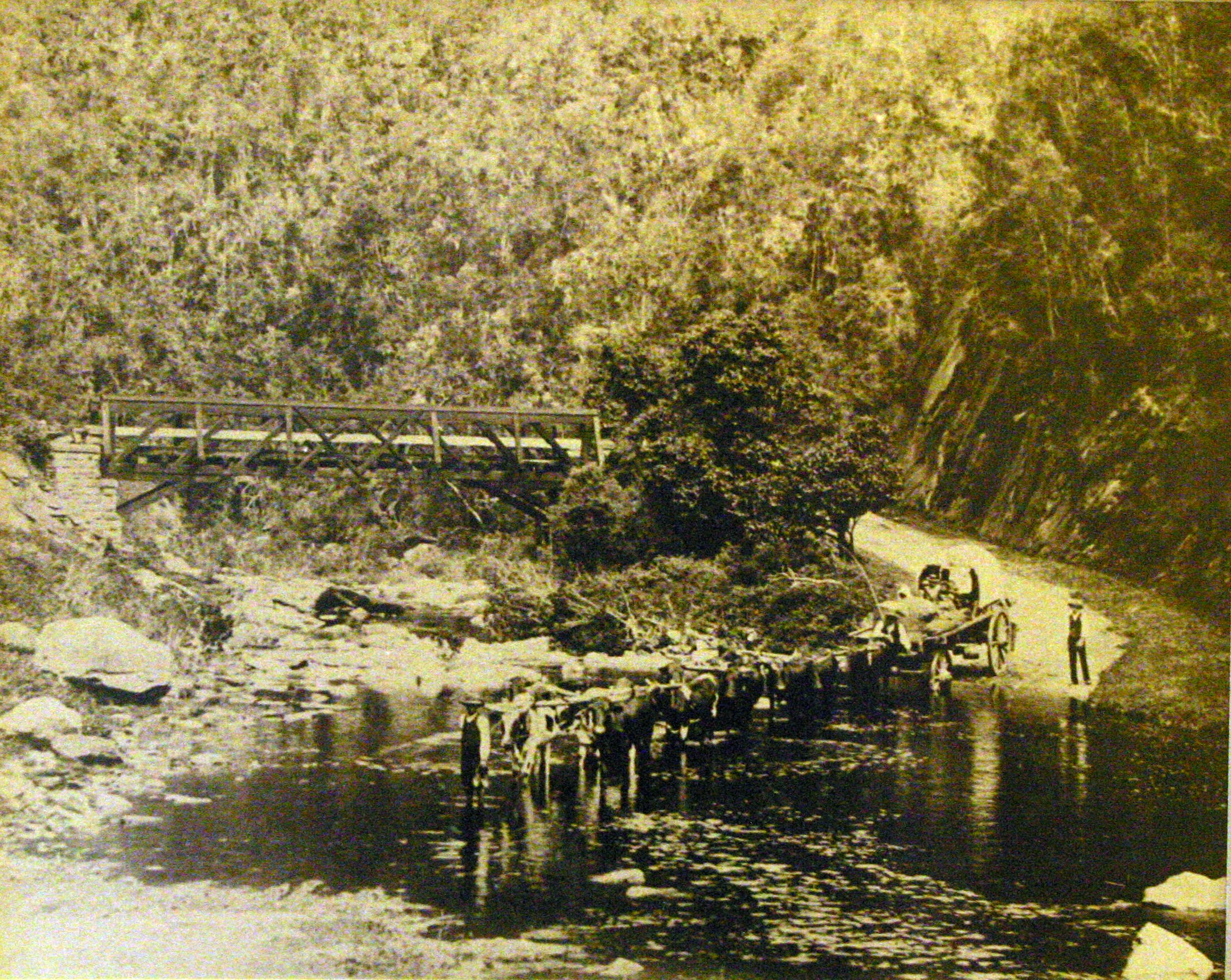
Ox-wagon crossing the Kaaimans River in late 19th century

During the 19th-century, development in the Cape Colony led to an increased demand for structural and furniture timber. This led to an unhealthy strain on the indigenous forests of the Southern Cape, which had been exploited since the days of Jan van Riebeeck. Farsighted planning called for the establishment of plantations of fast-growing exotic trees and trained foresters to manage them. To meet this need, the South African College Schools (SACS) started a course for forest rangers in 1902, but was superseded by the Tokai School for Forest Apprentices in 1912. At that stage forestry fell under the Department of Agriculture and was more conservation-oriented than concerned with afforestation; consequently the output of foresters was small at that time. With the rapid growth of the timber industry, it was decided to relocate Saasveld to its present position on the farm Pampoenkraal, due to its proximity to indigenous forest, open areas suitable for plantations of exotics, sawmills in the vicinity, and drying kilns in George. Many explorers, naturalists and botanists such as Thunberg, Sparrman, Le Vaillant, Drège, Ecklon and Zeyher had visited the farm in the preceding two centuries.

=== Early history ===
In 1854, the farm was subdivided and the portion on which the college would eventually be built was bought by the baroness Gesina van Rede van Oudtshoorn and named Saasveld, after her ancestral castle in Overijssel, in the Netherlands.

In 1867, Thomas Bain, road-maker, had surveyed the main road heading east to Knysna and passing through Pampoenkraal. In those days a toll gate was sited near the present entrance to Saasveld.

In 1917, Saasveld was bought by the George Forest Timber Co., and later acquired by Searles Limited. In 1928, ownership of the land finally passed to the State and work started on construction of the College.

=== Recent history ===
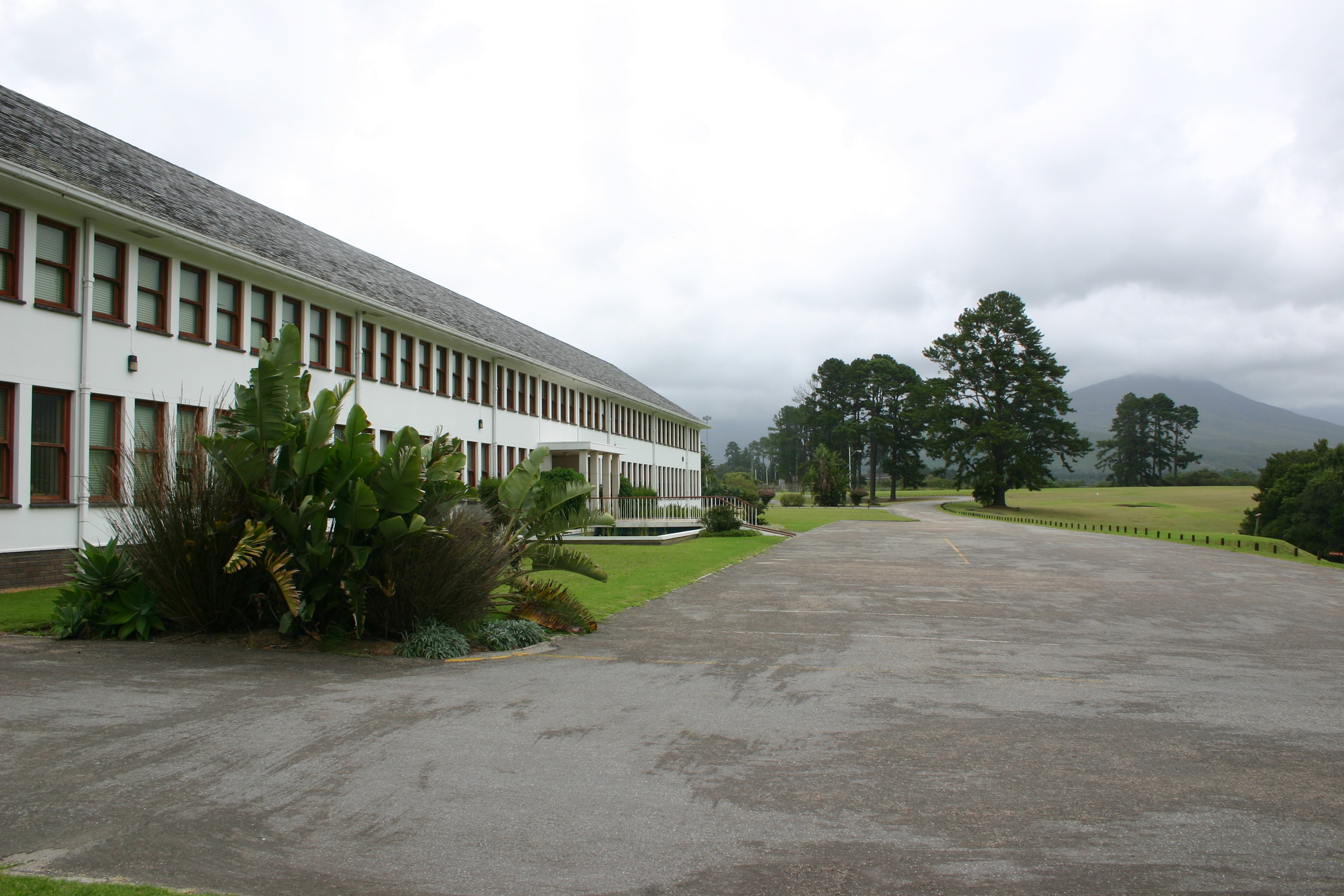
New buildings at Saasveld

The PE Technikon expanded to the Southern Cape in 1985 when it took over the Saasveld Forestry College from the Department of Forestry.

Nelson Mandela University (NMU), situated in Nelson Mandela Bay, opened on 1 January 2005, the result of a merger of the PE Technikon, the University of Port Elizabeth and the Port Elizabeth campus of Vista University. Saasveld is now a satellite campus of NMU.

== See also ==
- Joseph Storr Lister
- List of historic schools of forestry
