= Man and Nature =

1864 book by George Perkins Marsh

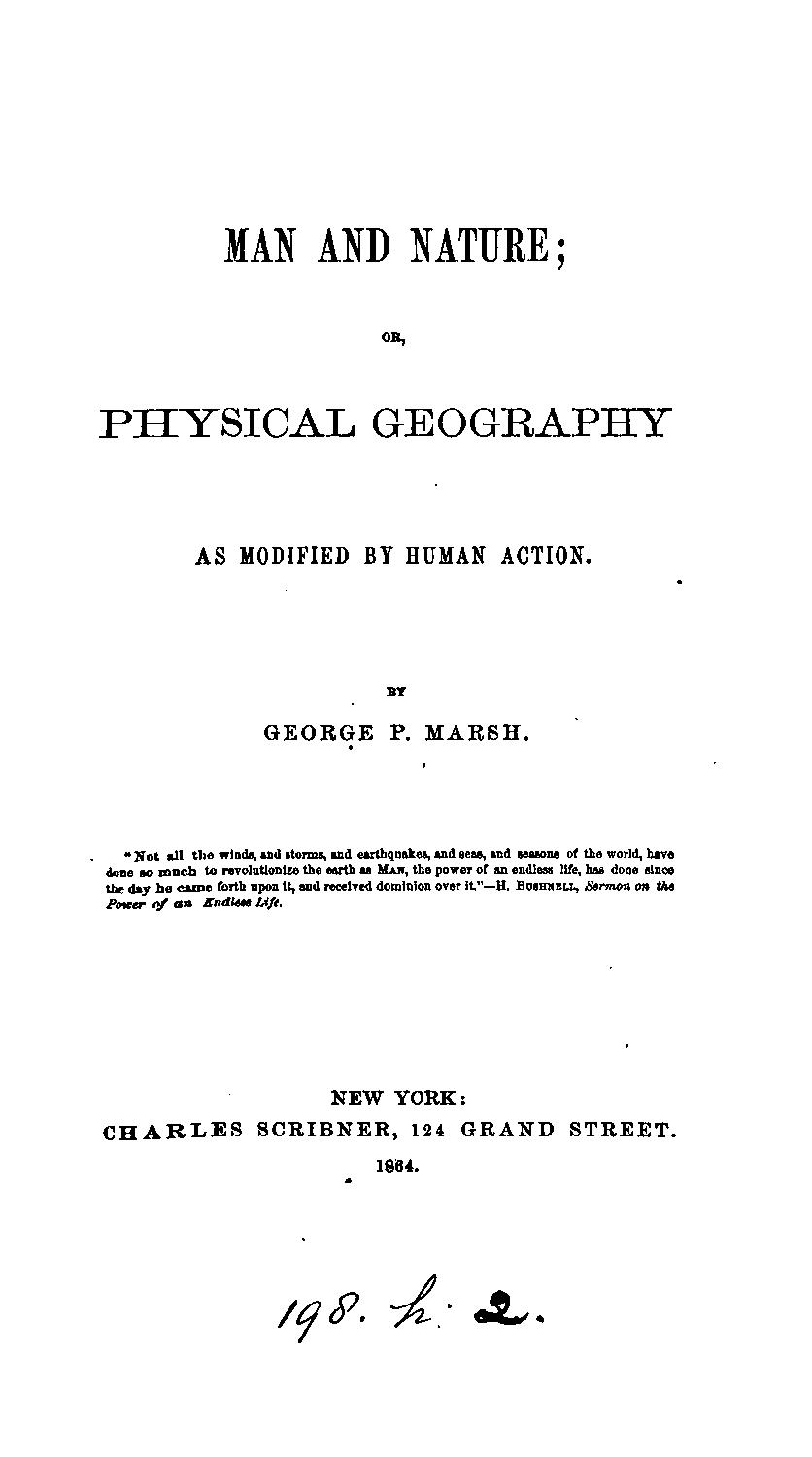
Title page 1864 edition

Man and Nature: Or, Physical Geography as Modified by Human Action, first published in 1864, was written by American polymath scholar and diplomat George Perkins Marsh (1801–1882). Marsh intended his text to show that "whereas [others] think the earth made man, man in fact made the earth." He warned that humans could destroy both themselves and the Earth if they failed to restore and sustain global resources and to raise awareness about their actions. The book is one of the earliest works to document the effects of human action on the environment, and it helped to launch the modern conservation movement.

Marsh is remembered by scholars as a profound and observant student of men, books, and nature, with a wide range of interests ranging from history to poetry and literature. His wide array of knowledge and outstanding natural powers of mind gave him the ability to speak and write about every topic of inquiry with the assertive authority of a genuine investigator. He initially got the idea for "Man and Nature" from his observations in his New England home and his foreign travels devoted to similar inquiries. Marsh wrote the book with the view that human life and action are transformative phenomena, especially in relation to nature and due to personal economic interests. He felt that men were too quick to lessen their sense of responsibility, and he was "unwilling to leave the world worse than he found it."

The book challenges the myth of the inexhaustibility of the earth and the belief that human impact on the environment is negligible by drawing similarities to the ancient civilization of the Mediterranean. Marsh argued that ancient Mediterranean civilizations collapsed through environmental degradation. Deforestation led to eroded soils that led to decreased soil productivity. Additionally, the same trends of environmental degradation and resource depletion could be found occurring in the United States, as evidenced by deforestation and soil erosion in various regions. The book was one of the most influential books of its time, next to Charles Darwin's On the Origin of Species (1859), inspiring conservation and reform in the USA since it documented what happened to an ancient civilization when it depleted and exhausted its resources. The book was instrumental in the designation of Adirondack Park in New York in 1892 and in the development of the United States National Forest from 1891 onwards. Gifford Pinchot, first Chief of the United States Forest Service, called the work "epoch-making," and Stewart Udall wrote that it was "the beginning of land wisdom in this country."

== Contents ==
The book is divided into six chapters.

- Chapter I: Introductory
- Chapter II: Transfer, Modification, and Extirpation of Vegetable and of Animal Species
- Chapter III: The Woods
- Chapter IV: The Waters
- Chapter V: The Sands
- Chapter VI: Projected or Possible Geographical Changes by Man

== See also ==
- Anthropocene
- Collapse: How Societies Choose to Fail or Succeed
