= Forestry in Bangladesh =

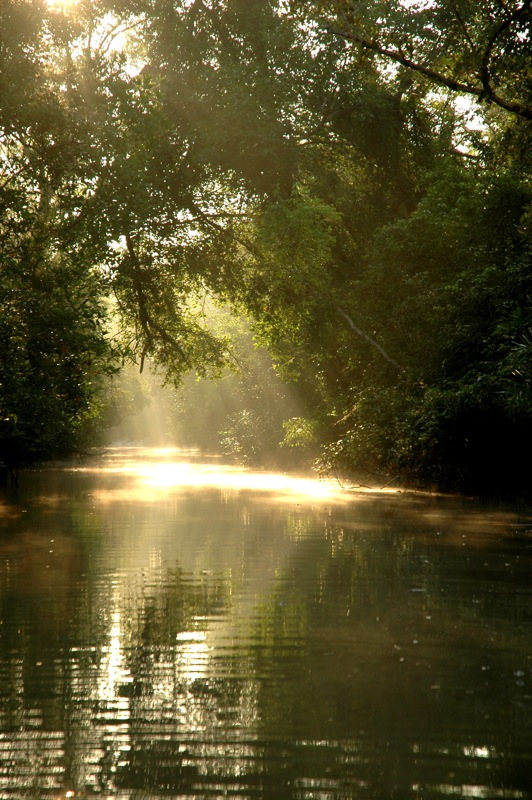
- Sunderbans, the biggest mangrove forest in the world

Wood is the main fuel for cooking and other domestic requirements. It is not surprising that population pressure has had an adverse effect on the indigenous forests. By 1980 only about 16 percent of the land was forested, and forests had all but disappeared from the densely populated and intensively cultivated deltaic plain. Aid organizations in the mid-1980s began looking into the possibility of stimulating small-scale forestry to restore a resource for which there was no affordable substitute. Bangladesh Forest Research Institute (BFRI) is the government organization under Ministry of Environment, Forest and Climate Change for research in this sector which was established in 1955 at Sholoshahar, Chittagong city.

The largest areas of forest are in the Chittagong Hill Tracts and the Sundarbans. The evergreen and deciduous forests of the Chittagong Hills cover more than 4,600 square kilometres (1,800 mi^{2}) and are the source of teak for heavy construction and boat building, as well as other forest products. Domesticated elephants are still used to haul logs. The Sundarbans, a tidal mangrove forest covering nearly 6,000 square kilometres (2,300 mi^{2}) along the Bay of Bengal, is the source of timber used for a variety of purposes, including pulp for the domestic paper industry, poles for electric power distribution, and leaves for thatching for dwellings. The total percentage of forests is 10.98%.

== Tree cover extent and loss ==
Global Forest Watch publishes annual estimates of tree cover loss and 2000 tree cover extent derived from time-series analysis of Landsat satellite imagery in the Global Forest Change dataset. In this framework, tree cover refers to vegetation taller than 5 m (including natural forests and tree plantations), and tree cover loss is defined as the complete removal of tree cover canopy for a given year, regardless of cause.

For Bangladesh, country statistics report cumulative tree cover loss of 261,746 ha (2,617.46 km^{2}) from 2001 to 2024 (about 13.5% of its 2000 tree cover area). For tree cover density greater than 30%, country statistics report a 2000 tree cover extent of 1,938,958 ha (19,389.58 km^{2}). The charts and table below display this data. In simple terms, the annual loss number is the area where tree cover disappeared in that year, and the extent number shows what remains of the 2000 tree cover baseline after subtracting cumulative loss. Forest regrowth is not included in the dataset.

Annual tree cover loss in Bangladesh, 2001–2024. View chart definition.
Tree cover extent in 2000 minus cumulative tree cover loss in Bangladesh, 2001–2024 (loss-only residual; does not account for gain). View chart definition.

Annual tree cover extent and loss
Year	Tree cover extent (km2) (Note: This residual measure does not include forest regrowth.)	Annual tree cover loss (km2)
2001	19,343.71	45.87
2002	19,303.76	39.95
2003	19,282.16	21.60
2004	19,239.34	42.82
2005	19,206.41	32.93
2006	19,137.79	68.62
2007	19,097.83	39.96
2008	19,053.04	44.79
2009	18,996.78	56.26
2010	18,950.10	46.68
2011	18,908.29	41.81
2012	18,854.70	53.59
2013	18,794.48	60.22
2014	18,673.87	120.61
2015	18,547.83	126.04
2016	18,335.87	211.96
2017	18,052.10	283.77
2018	17,858.67	193.43
2019	17,637.88	220.79
2020	17,423.13	214.75
2021	17,247.26	175.87
2022	17,109.28	137.98
2023	16,931.41	177.87
2024	16,772.12	159.29

== REDD+ forest reference level and monitoring ==
Bangladesh has submitted a national forest reference level (FRL) under the UNFCCC REDD+ framework. On the UNFCCC REDD+ Web Platform, its 2019 submission is listed as having an assessed reference level, while the other Warsaw Framework elements—a national strategy, safeguards, and a national forest monitoring system—are listed as “not reported”.

The FRL was submitted in 2019 and assessed in 2020. It covers three REDD+ activities at national scale—reducing emissions from deforestation, reducing emissions from forest degradation, and enhancement of forest carbon stocks—and uses a 2000–2015 historical reference period. Following the technical assessment and a modified submission, the assessed FRL was 374,253 t CO2 eq per year, expressed as the annual average of CO2 emissions from deforestation and forest degradation and removals from enhancement of forest carbon stocks.

The technical assessment reports that activity data were based on national land-cover maps for 2000 and 2015 derived from satellite imagery, while emission factors were harmonized from several national and subnational forest inventories. The FRL included above-ground and below-ground biomass and reported CO2 only, while excluding deadwood, litter and soil organic carbon. Bangladesh also used a modified forest definition for the FRL in order to include mangrove forests in the Sundarbans dominated by Ceriops decandra, lowering the height threshold for that forest type to 2 metres.

== Forestry universities ==
There are three universities in Bangladesh where a student can enroll for an undergraduate degree in forestry. Among them the Institute of Forestry and Environmental Sciences under Chittagong University offers undergraduate and graduate degrees both in Forestry and in Environmental Sciences. This is the premier institute for Forestry education in Bangladesh. The three universities of Bangladesh offering undergraduate and graduate degree in Forestry are:

Name of Institution	Location	Degree
Chittagong University	Chittagong	B.Sc./M.S./M.Phil./Ph.D..
Shahjalal University of Science and Technology	Sylhet	B.Sc./M.Sc.
Khulna University	Khulna	B.Sc./M.S/Ph.D.
