= Moscow State Forest University =

Coordinates: 55°55′39″N 37°47′28″E

Moscow State Forest University (Russian: Московский государственный университет леса) (MSFU) is a specialized establishment of higher education which trains engineering personnel, scientists as well as bachelors and masters for forest industry, wood processing and pulp and paper industry and is an educational and scientific center of forest complex of the country. One school (commonly called in Russia "a faculty", and is similar to a college within a university) of the university prepares specialists for the aerospace industry.

Established in 1919 as the Moscow Forest Engineering Institute, the school was Russia's "first higher education institution for training forest engineers."

There are nine schools (colleges) in the university specializing in forest engineering and one school (college) specializing in electronics, applied mathematics and computer science Faculty of Computer Science (FEST). FEST was founded in 1959 on an initiative by academician Sergey Pavlovich Korolev with the goal to prepare engineers for the Soviet Aerospace industry.

Since 2016 Moscow State Forest University is a division of Bauman Moscow State Technical University, BMSTU (Russian: Московский государственный технический университет им. Н. Э. Баумана (МГТУ им. Н. Э. Баумана)), sometimes colloquially referred to as the Bauman School or Baumanka (Russian: Ба́уманка) is a public technical university (Polytechnic) located in Moscow, Russia.

== See also ==
- List of historic schools of forestry
