= George Perkins Marsh =

American diplomat and politician (1801–1882)

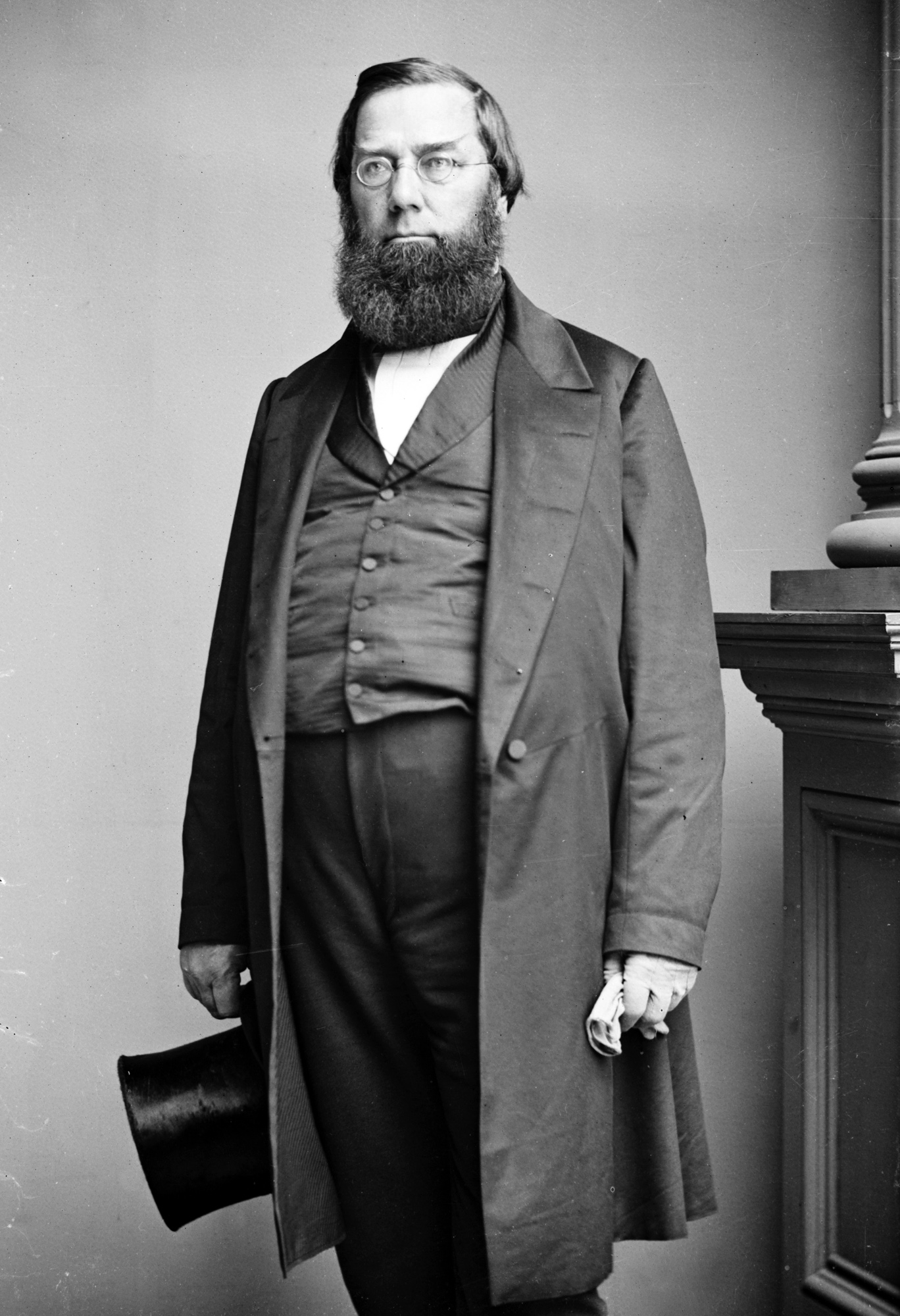
- Marsh, 1855–1865

1st United States Minister to Italy
- In office June 23, 1861 – July 23, 1882
- President: Abraham Lincoln; Andrew Johnson; Ulysses S. Grant; Rutherford B. Hayes; James A. Garfield; Chester A. Arthur
- Preceded by: Diplomatic relations established
- Succeeded by: William Waldorf Astor

3rd United States Minister Resident to the Ottoman Empire
- In office March 11, 1850 – December 19, 1853
- President: Zachary Taylor; Millard Fillmore; Franklin Pierce
- Preceded by: Dabney Smith Carr
- Succeeded by: Carroll Spence

Member of the U.S. House of Representatives from Vermont's 3rd district
- In office March 4, 1843 – May 29, 1849
- Preceded by: Horace Everett
- Succeeded by: James Meacha m

Personal details
- Born: March 15, 1801 Woodstock, Vermont, U.S.
- Died: July 23, 1882 (aged 81) Vallombrosa, Reggello, Kingdom of Italy
- Party: Whig, Republican
- Parents: Charles Marsh (father); Susan Perkins (mother)
- Education: Dartmouth College
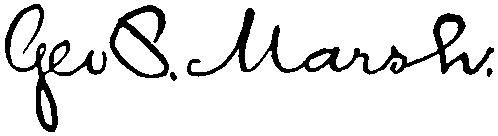
- Signature

George Perkins Marsh (March 15, 1801 – July 23, 1882) was an American lawyer, diplomat, politician, and philologist. After serving in the United States Congress in the 1840s, he went on to be a diplomat in the Ottoman Empire and the first United States Minister to Italy. Marsh is also considered by some to be America's first environmentalist and by recognizing the irreversible impact of man's actions on the earth, a precursor to the sustainability concept, although "conservationist" would be more accurate. The Marsh-Billings-Rockefeller National Historical Park in Vermont takes its name, in part, from Marsh. His 1864 book Man and Nature had a great impact in many parts of the world.

== Biography ==
George Perkins Marsh was born in Woodstock, Vermont, to a prominent family. His father, Charles Marsh, had been a member of the U.S. House of Representatives. George Marsh graduated from Phillips Academy, Andover, Massachusetts, in 1816 and from Dartmouth College with highest honors in 1820 and taught at Norwich University the following year. He studied law in Burlington, Vermont, was admitted to the bar in 1825, and practiced law in Burlington. He also devoted himself to philological studies. In 1835 he was appointed to the Executive Council of Vermont, and from 1843 to 1849 was a Whig representative in Congress. He served as an editor of Ancient Monuments of the Mississippi Valley which was published in 1848.

In 1849 President Zachary Taylor appointed Marsh United States minister resident in the Ottoman Empire. He rendered valuable service to the cause of civil and religious toleration in that empire. In 1852–1853, he discharged a mission to Greece in connection with the imprisonment of American missionary Jonas King. He accomplished this task with a vigor that surprised the diplomats of Athens and showed a masterly knowledge of the Greek constitution and legislation, as well as of international law.

In 1849, Marsh was elected as a member of the American Philosophical Society.

Marsh was elected a member of the American Antiquarian Society in 1851.

He returned to Vermont in 1854. In 1857 he was appointed by the governor of Vermont to make a report to the legislature in regard to the artificial propagation of fish. He had previously been appointed one of the commissioners to rebuild the state house at Montpelier and in 1857 was appointed as the state railroad commissioner, succeeding Charles Linsley.

In 1861, President Abraham Lincoln appointed Marsh the first United States minister to the Kingdom of Italy. Marsh would go on to be the longest-serving chief of mission in U.S. history, serving as envoy for 21 years until his death at Vallombrosa in 1882. He is buried at the Protestant Cemetery in Rome.

== Work ==
Marsh was an able linguist, able to both speak and write fluently in Swedish and over 20 other languages. He was a philologist and a scholar of great breadth, trained in military science, engraving and physics, as well as Icelandic, which was his specialty. He wrote many articles for Johnson's Universal Cyclopaedia, and contributed many reviews and letters to The Nation.

He was an admirer of the Goths, whose presence he traced in whatever is great and peculiar in the character of the founders of New England. He owned the finest collection of Scandinavian literature outside of Scandinavia. Part of it ultimately became the property of the University of Vermont, through the liberality of Frederick Billings. During the winter of 1858/9 he began a course of thirty lectures on the English language at Columbia University, and a year later he delivered a second course, on the grammatical history of English literature, before the Lowell Institute, in Boston. Marsh played a role in the creation of the first edition of the Oxford English Dictionary by acting as Coordinator of the American readers.

In 1847 Marsh gave a speech to the Agricultural Society of Rutland County, Vermont, adhering to the idea that man's activities influence local and regional climate by cutting and clearing forests, and draining swamps. This was a common debate among philosophers, naturalists, and local elites on both sides of the Atlantic Ocean during the Enlightenment era, including David Hume, Comte de Buffon, Thomas Jefferson, Hugh Williamson, Alexander von Humboldt, Charles Lyell, and many others in the turn of the eighteenth to the nineteenth centuries:

"Man cannot at his pleasure command the rain and the sunshine, the wind and frost and snow, yet it is certain that climate itself has in many instances been gradually changed and ameliorated or deteriorated by human action. The draining of swamps and the clearing of forests perceptibly affect the evaporation from the earth, and of course the mean quantity of moisture suspended in the air. The same causes modify the electrical condition of the atmosphere and the power of the surface to reflect, absorb and radiate the rays of the sun, and consequently influence the distribution of light and heat, and the force and direction of the winds. Within narrow limits too, domestic fires and artificial structures create and diffuse increased warmth, to an extent that may affect vegetation. The mean temperature of London is a degree or two higher than that of the surrounding country, and Pallas believed, that the climate of even so thinly a peopled country as Russia was sensibly modified by similar causes."

His book Man and Nature (1864) constituted an early work of ecology, and played a role in the creation of the Adirondack Park. Marsh argued that deforestation could lead to desertification. Referring to the clearing of once-lush lands surrounding the Mediterranean, he asserted "the operation of causes set in action by man has brought the face of the earth to a desolation almost as complete as that of the moon." He argued that welfare is secured as long as man manages resources and keep them in good condition. Welfare of future generations should be one of resource management determinants. Resource scarcity is a result of misbalancing an environmental equilibrium. In other words: it comes from unreasonable human action rather than is determined by some absolute resource scarcity. He also studied the work of the Italian foresters, particularly Adolf von Berenger and was influenced by the approaches to forest restoration. Marsh was visiting Berenger at the forestry institute in Vallombrosa at the time of his death.

== Works ==
- A Compendious Grammar of the Old Northern or Icelandic Language (1838), compiled and translated from the grammars of Rask
- The Camel, his Organization, Habits, and Uses, with Reference to his Introduction into the United States (1856)
- Lectures on the English Language (1860)
- The Origin and History of the English Language (1862; revised ed., 1885)
- Man and Nature (1864; Italian tr. 1872)
- The Earth as Modified by Human Action (1874; rev. ed., 1885), a largely rewritten version of Man and Nature
- Mediaeval and Modern Saints and Miracles (1876)

He prepared an American edition of Hensleigh Wedgwood's Dictionary of English Etymology (New York, 1862), to which he made large additions and annotations. He translated Rask's Icelandic Grammar.

== Family ==
His second wife, Caroline (Crane) Marsh (1816–1901), whom he married in 1839, published Wolfe of the Knoll and other Poems (1860), and the Life and Letters of George Perkins Marsh (New York, 1888). This last work was left incomplete, the second volume never having been published. She also translated from the German of Johann C. Biernatzki (1795–1840), The Hallig; or the Sheepfold in the Waters (1856). (See "Hallig").

== Art collection ==
Marsh actively studied and collected engravings, including European Old Master prints. His collection included more than a thousand prints by various artists, dating from the 15th to the 19th centuries, representing works by Rembrandt, Albrecht Dürer, William Hogarth and others. In 1849, the Smithsonian Institution purchased a large group of Marsh's European prints and art books, which was transferred on deposit to the Library of Congress in 1865. During the 1880s and 1890s, the Smithsonian got some of the Marsh Collection returned, but part of it still remains at the Library of Congress.

== See also ==
- Environmental history of the United States

== Notes ==
U.S. House of Representatives
Preceded by Horace Everett	Member of the U.S. House of Representatives from Vermont's 3rd congressional district 1843–1849	Succeeded by James Meacham
