= Joseph Storr Lister =

South African forester

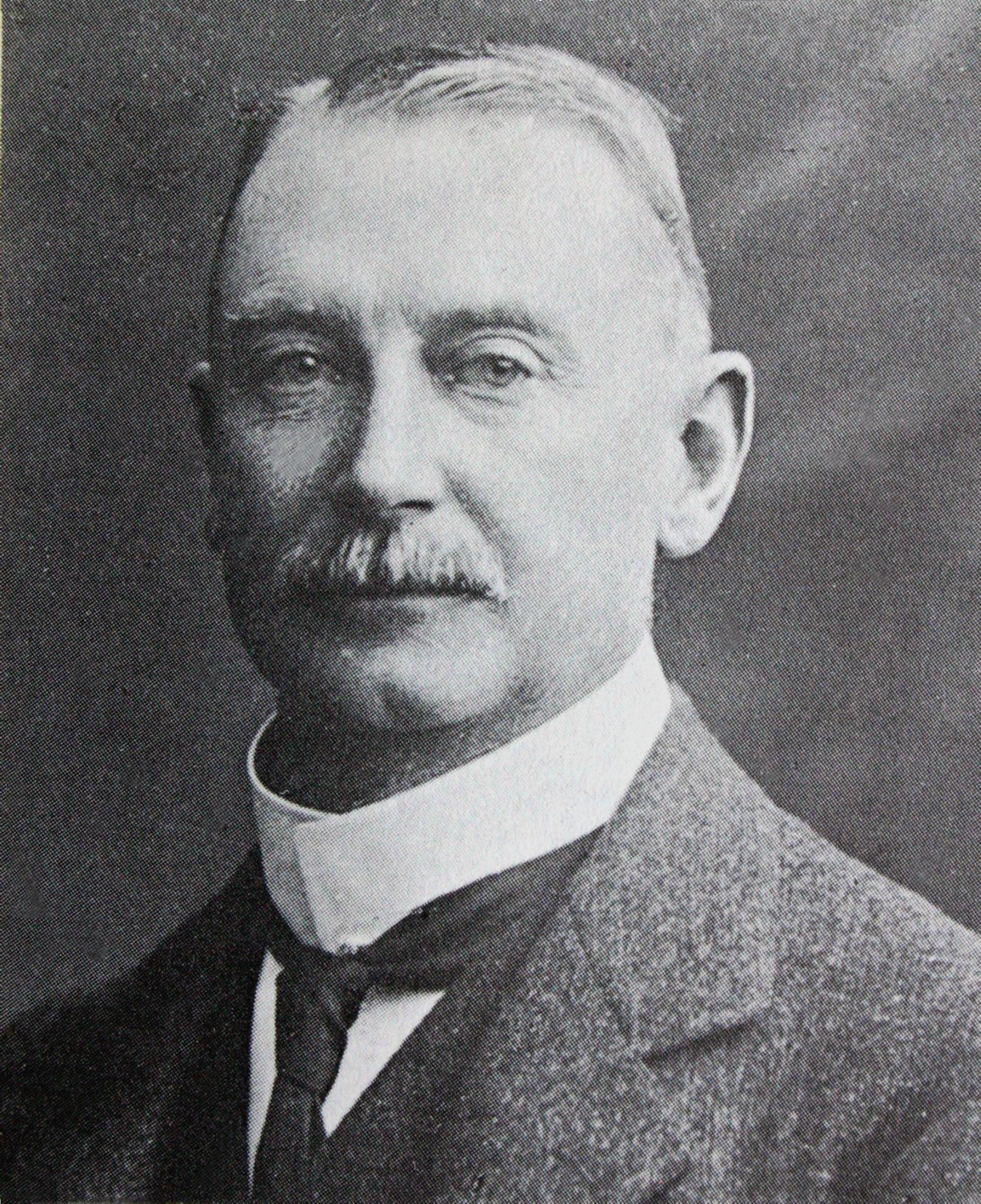

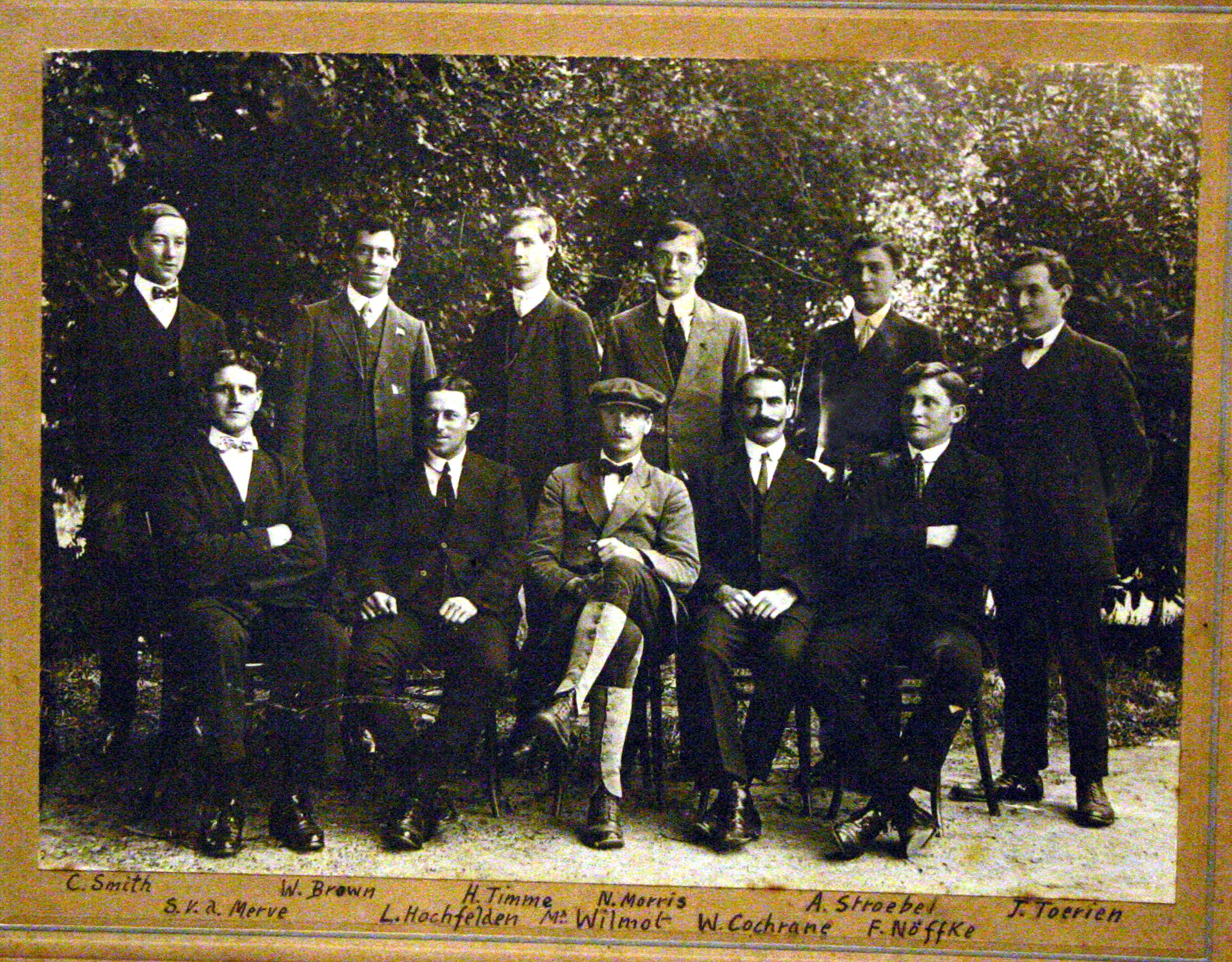
1914 Class of Tokai Foresters

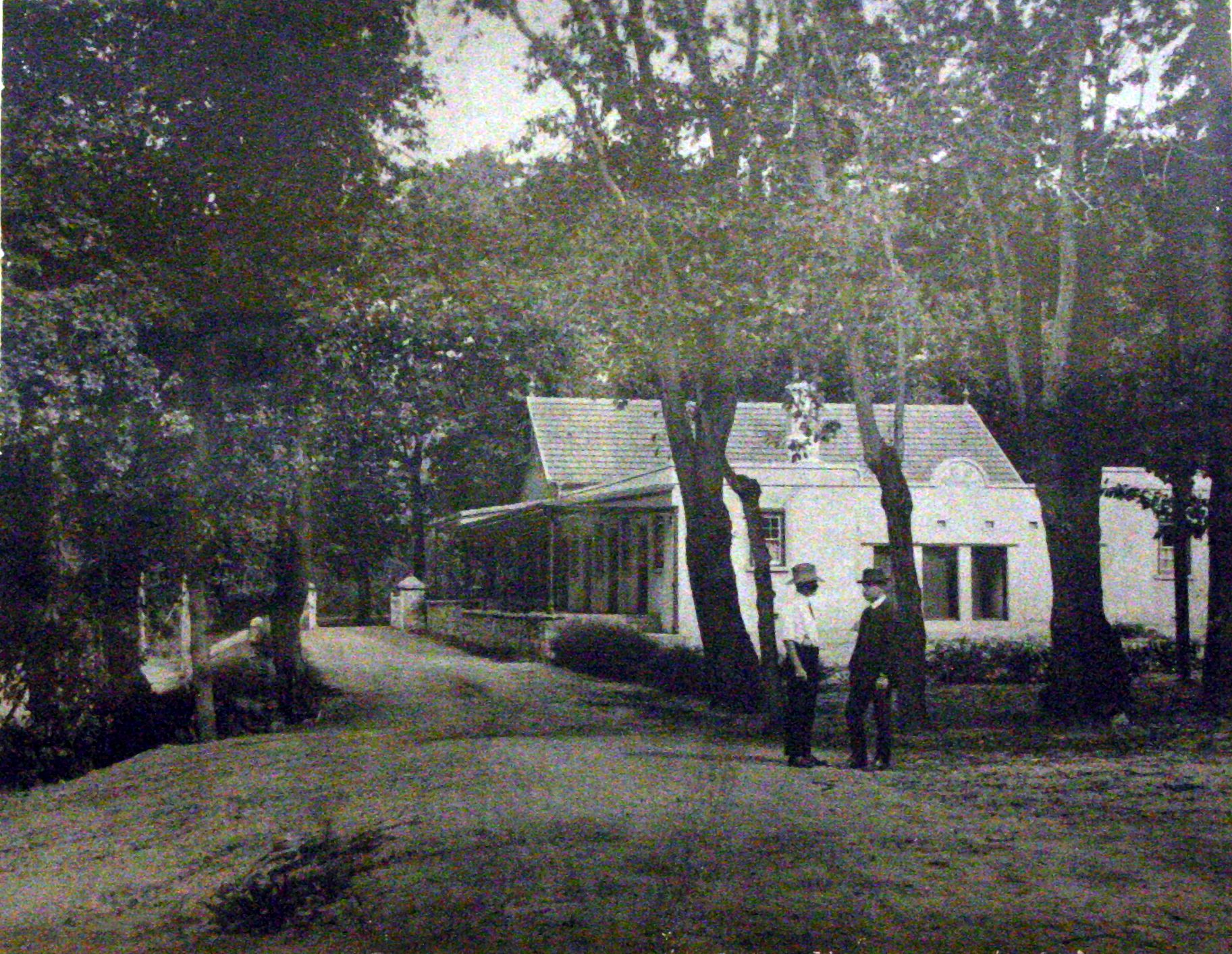
South African Forestry School at Tokai (1910)

Joseph Storr Lister (1 October 1852 in Uitenhage – 27 February 1927 in Kenilworth, Cape Town) was a South African forester and Conservator of Forests. He was educated at the Diocesan College in Rondebosch, and in 1885 married Georgina Bain, daughter of Thomas Charles John Bain, the roadbuilder and engineer.

Lister joined South African forestry during a period when commercial plantations of exotic timbers were being established and expanded on a large scale. Fresh from Punjab and the Indian Forest Service, he was appointed in 1875 as Superintendent of Plantations and based in Cape Town. Remarkably he was also selected to be custodian of Langalibalele, who had been banished to Robben Island after a mock trial by the British authorities for his part in a Zulu rebellion, and Cetewayo, deposed and exiled, first to Cape Town, and then to London for his role in the Anglo-Zulu War.

Lister soon came to understand the urgent need for growing exotic timbers which would reduce the pressure on indigenous species, and started by establishing at Worcester in 1876 a plantation of fast-growing Eucalypts to supply fuel for the railways. De Beers bought the Worcester plantation in 1892, and this sale resulted in a profit of some £60/acre, stimulating a wave of afforestation. Lister also planted the Tokai Arboretum against the slopes of Constantiaberg outside Cape Town in 1885 - an experimental stand of some 1555 trees representing 274 species of commercially promising trees including oaks, eucalypts and Californian Redwood. Between 1902 and 1903 he organised Forest Departments for Zululand and Natal, and for the Orange River Colony. In 1906 he established the South African Forestry School at Tokai in order to train men for the higher grades of forest service, and in 1912 the School started training foresters. Twenty years later in 1932 the training of foresters was moved to Saasveld Forestry College near George and was known as the 'Saasveld College for Foresters'. In 1910 Lister became the first Chief Conservator of Forests for the newly constituted Union of South Africa.

In 1877, Lister turned his attention to driftsand reclamation at Bellville near Cape Town, where sand was threatening both the road and railway line to the north. He arranged for the town refuse to be spread over the dunes and then planted Acacia cyclops and Acacia cyanophylla between - this stopped movement of the sand and created a valuable source of fuel. In 1893 he carried out the same reclamation program at Port Elizabeth with complete success. The Port Elizabeth suburb of Listerwood was named in his honour, and a small stone monument, next to Marine Drive in Summerstrand, was built as a memorial. Lister retired in 1913 having rendered 38 years of distinguished service. He was succeeded by the Scottish-born forester Charles Edward Legat.

== See also ==
- List of historic schools of forestry
