= Charles Edward Legat =

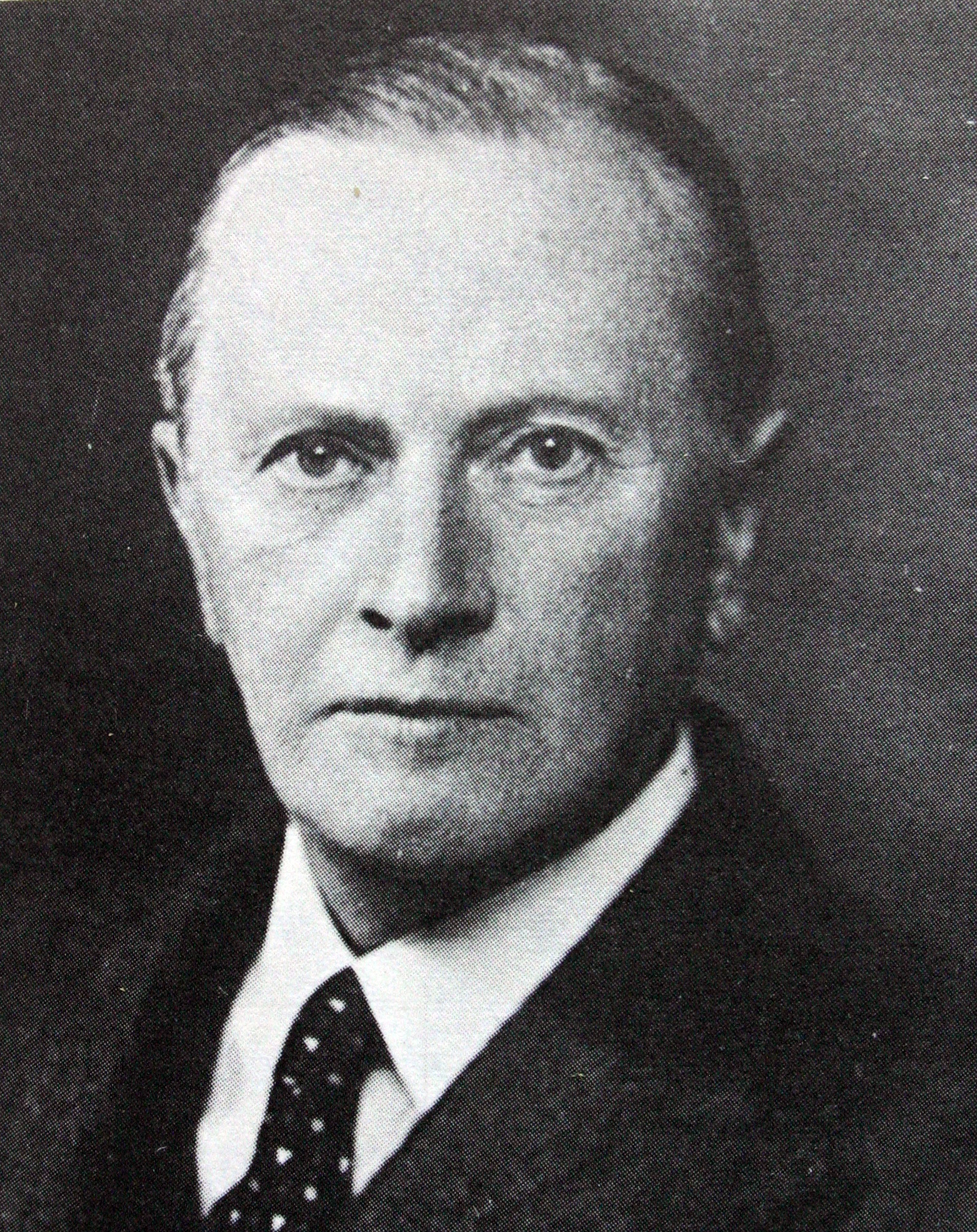

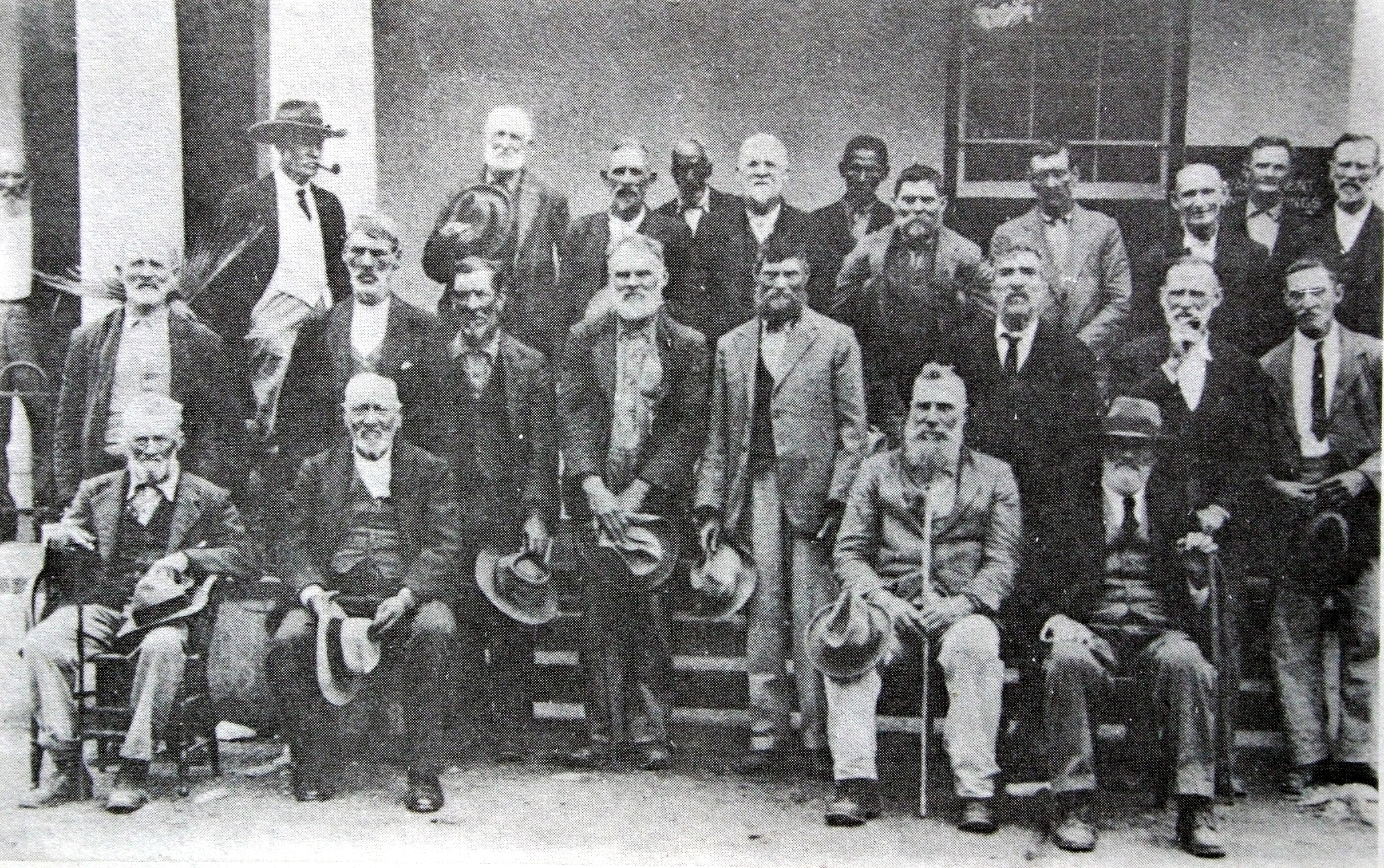
A woodcutters' deputation in front of the forestry office at Knysna

Charles Edward Legat CBE (16 January 1876 – 10 October 1966) was the Scottish-born Chief Conservator of Forests in South Africa from 1913 to 1931.

Legat was born in Musselburgh, Midlothian and educated in Edinburgh where he was awarded a B.Sc. (Agriculture), also taking courses in field geology, botany and zoology. He came to South Africa in 1898 and took up an appointment with the Cape Forestry Department, was transferred to the Transvaal in 1902, and promoted to Conservator of Forests in 1904. In 1913 he succeeded Joseph Storr Lister as Chief Conservator and immediately set about seeking a solution to the woodcutter problems in the Southern Cape forests. A considerable population of woodcutters had become financially dependent on these forests, leading to over-exploitation in order to keep them supplied with timber. The passing of the Forest Act of 1913 restricted woodcutting to those who were actually engaged in the practice at the time of the Act.

In 1914, Legat was asked by the Smuts government to prepare a proposal on how poor whites could be employed in an afforestation scheme. This scheme was designed specifically to assist those woodcutters who had become unemployed because of the 1913 Act. It was accepted that higher wages would be paid than the black workers had been receiving. This placed Legat in the awkward situation where government wanted Forestry to be profitable, yet at the same time make use of the most expensive labour. The onset of World War I delayed implementation of the scheme, but in 1916 it was revived and two settlements were proposed – one at French Hoek just outside Franschhoek and the other at Jonkersberg north of Great Brak River. The workers were to be provided with a house on a small plot of land, free medical care and paid a wage, while soldiers returning from World War I, many of whom were classed as poor whites, also prompted the launching of the program.

In 1928, Legat represented South Africa at the Forestry Conference held in Perth, Australia.

Legat returned to the United Kingdom after his retirement and settled in Farnham, Surrey. He was appointed Commander of the Most Excellent Order of the British Empire (CBE) in 1939 for services to the Empire Forestry Association. In 1943, he served as vice-chairman of the Empire Forestry Association and was a member of the Governing Council. He died in Surrey in 1966.

He was commemorated in the botanical names Maerua legatii Burtt Davy, Syzygium legatii Burtt Davy & Greenway and Rhus legatii Schönland.

== Publications ==
- "Trees of the North-Eastern Transvaal" - C.E.Legat (Bulletin of Miscellaneous Information, Royal Gardens, Kew, 1910)
- The Propagation of Trees from Seed - C.E.Legat (Government Printing and Stationery Office, 1921)
- The Cultivation of Exotic Conifers in South Africa - C. E. Legat (Empire Forestry Association, 1929)
- The Empire Forestry Handbook 1938 - edited by C.E.Legat
