= Adolf von Berenger =

German-born forester in Italy

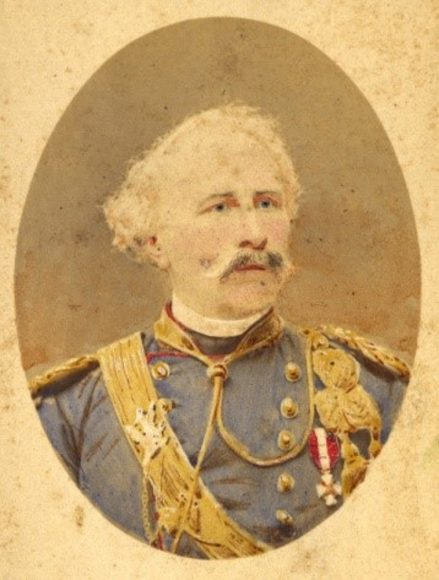

Joseph Maria Adolf von Berenger or in Italian as Adolfo di Bérenger (28 February 1815 – 3 March 1895) was a German-born forester who worked in Italy. He established the first forestry school in Italy at Vallombrosa, now called the Forest Institute of Vallombrosa. He is considered the founder of Italian forestry.

== Life and work ==
Berenger was born in Ebenau, Munich, the son of Johann August, a Bavarian officer of French origins and estate owner and his wife Johann Eugenia von Fabris. He studied in Munich, and then at the Mariabrunn Academy near Vienna and joined service in Venice under the Duke of Parma. In 1849 he became a forest inspector and was involved in studying the Cadore forest cutting system. From 1856 he was in charge of the forests of Cansiglio where he studied the plantation of white fir in clearings. He was made adjunct general of the central forestry inspectorate of Veneto in 1858. In 1865 he was transferred to Venice. After the annexation of Veneto into the Austro-Hungarian Empire in 1866 he was appointed Inspector General of Forestry under the Ministry of Agriculture and also appointed as the first director to the national forest academy which was begun at Vallombrosa in 1869. His work on forest conservation often involved dealing with local opposition and while he saw livestock herding as an ancient and important livelihood he was involved in imposing limits to the number of animals allowed to graze inside forests. He published some early guides to the use of mathematical approaches in managing forests, with notes from 1865 to 66 titled Rudimenti di matematica applicata specialmente alla tassazione ed assestamento delle foreste. In 1877 he clashed with the minister Salvatore Maiorana-Calatabiano on a forestry bill. Also faced with the death of his son Augusto he retired prematurely at the age of 62 but continued to work on forestry research. He was able to continue to conduct experiments in reforestation. He published a 800-page treatise on forestry Selvicoltora (1887). He promoted a system of planting uneven aged stands which were closer to nature. He also wrote on the history of forests in Archeologia forestale and established a system of taxation for forest use that became the norm in Europe. He corresponded with George Perkins Marsh who appreciated the Studii di archeologia forestale and made use of ideas from Italian forestry such as artificial rejuvenation of forests and "imitating nature" in his book Man and Nature (1864). At the time of his death, Marsh was visiting Berenger in Vallombrosa. Berenger suffered from blindness towards the end of his life and died in Rome where he was buried at Magnale.
