= Eberswalde University for Sustainable Development =

- Established: 1830; 196 years ago
- Location: Eberswalde
- Website: www.hnee.de
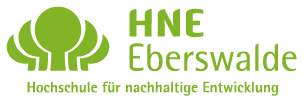

The Eberswalde University for Sustainable Development (German: Hochschule für nachhaltige Entwicklung Eberswalde, literally University for Sustainable Development; abbreviated in German as HNE Eberswalde or HNEE) is a Fachhochschule in Eberswalde, Germany. It was founded 1830 as a higher institute (Höhere Forstlehranstalt) of forestry. It was re-established in its present form as a Fachhochschule, or university of applied sciences, in 1992, with a range of courses and content geared towards sustainable development. In 2010 it was renamed the Entwicklung Eberswalde (FH). Its current president is Matthias Barth.

== Notable person ==
- Julius Lothar Meyer

== See also ==
- List of historic schools of forestry
