= Institute of Forestry and Environmental Sciences =

Academic institute of the University of Chittagong

Institute of Forestry and Environmental Sciences, University of Chittagong
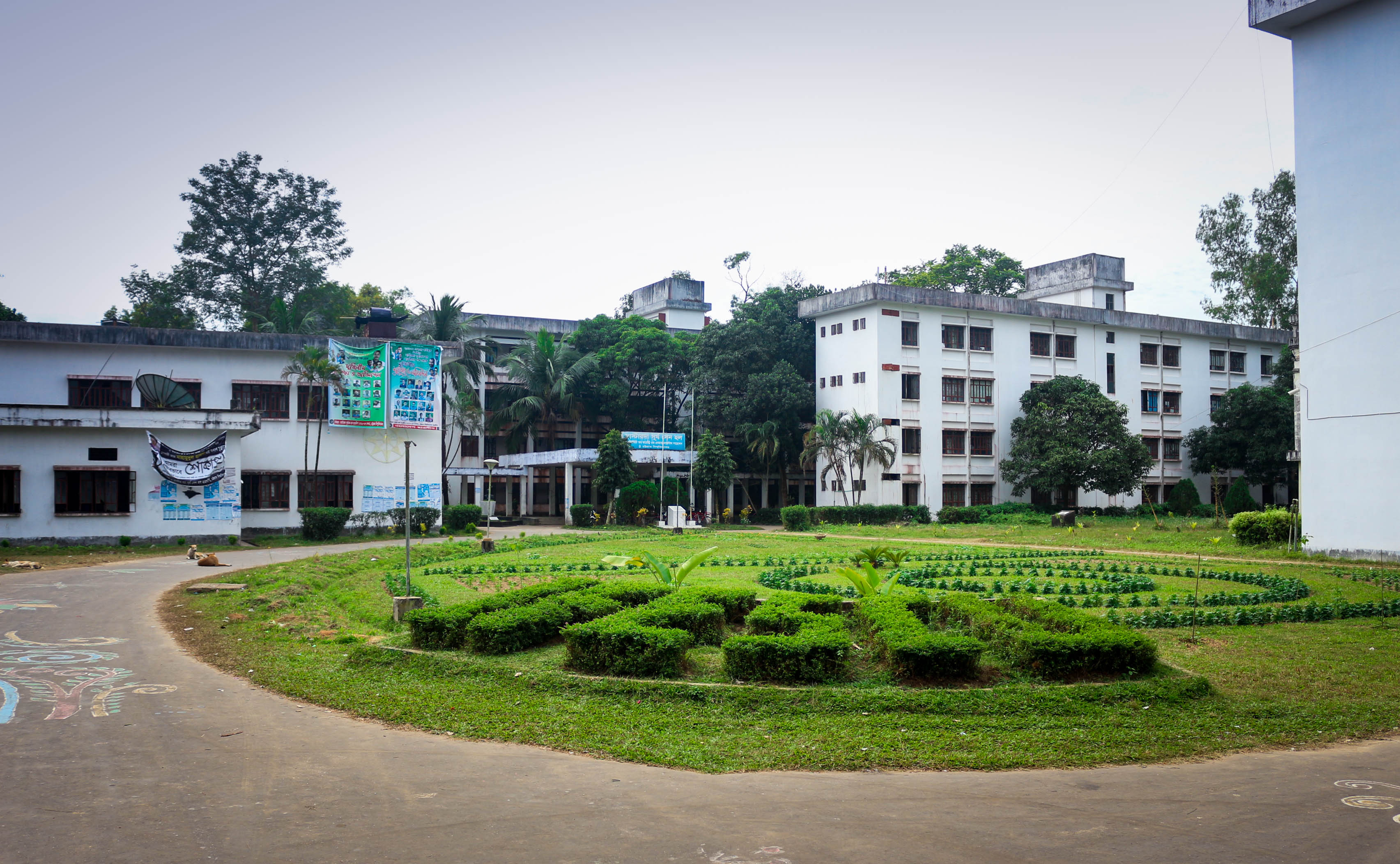
- Institute of Forestry and Environmental Sciences
- Parent institution: University of Chittagong
- Established: 1976
- Director: Dr. Md. Akhter Hossain
- Faculty: Faculty of Sciences
- Location: Hathazari, Chittagong, Bangladesh
- Coordinates: 22.4616479°N 91.7944951°E
- Interactive map of Institute of Forestry and Environmental Sciences, University of Chittagong
- Website: cu.ac.bd/ifes/

Institute of Forestry and Environmental Sciences, CU (IFESCU) was established in 1976 as Institute of Forestry with the help of Ministry of Environment and Forest, and Bangladesh Forest Department, under University of Chittagong, Bangladesh. It's the pioneer institute for forestry education in Bangladesh. Later, it was renamed as Institute of Forestry and Environmental Sciences in 1996. The Institute started providing in-service training (Master of Forestry) to newly recruited ACF (Assistant Conservator of Forests) in 1977–78, regular 4-year B.Sc. (Hons.) in Forestry in 1978–79, M.Sc. in Forestry in 1996, B.Sc. (Hons.) in Environmental Science in 2000-2001 and M.Sc. in Environmental Science in 2004.

== See also ==
- Forestry in Bangladesh
