= Centre Forestier =

Vocational centre in France

Coordinates: 43.771°N 5.655°E

Centre Forestier or Centre Forestier de la région Provence-Alpes-Côte d'Azur (meaning The Forestry Training Centre of the Region Provence-Alpes-Côte d'Azur in English), is a French vocational training centre focused on forestry and related fields in the Provence-Alpes-Côte d'Azur region of France. It provides education, training, and resources for individuals interested in careers related to forestry, land management, and environmental conservation. The centre is located in La Bastide-des-Jourdans of Vaucluse.

== Academics ==
The Centre Forestier trains around 280 individuals, including both young people and adults pursuing diploma programs giving both apprenticeship and professional contracts. It also offers professional training to over 1,450 people annually from various regions in France, and employs several dozen staff members.

== Administration ==
The Centre Forestier's managerial association dates back to 1965. The contemporary organizational framework of the Center comprises several key entities, namely:

- The Board of Directors.
- The Enhancement Council, featuring noteworthy participation from the professional representation within the "wood forest sector."
- The Management Committee, presided over by the director and composed of training executives and other managerial figures.

The centre is a member of UNREP.

== History ==
The Centre Forestier, established as a non-profit organization under the purview of French law 1901, traces its origins to its inception in 1975, with its managerial association dating back to 1965.

The timeline of the organization's history is as follows:

In 1965, due to a lack of official educational institutions for agricultural training in the canton, a group of individuals associated with the Bastide of the Olds and the surrounding area established an agricultural school in the Pertuis region under the framework of a 1901 Association law.

By 1974, the forest sector's national decision prompted a change in focus for the association. Christian Salvignol implemented the first steps and established the forest center.

In 1975, the small agricultural school transformed into the Forest Center of the Provence Alpes Côte-d'Azur region, aligning with the Unrep and operating in less than ideal conditions within the village.

By 1982, the Forest Center's Director became the President of the National Association for Forest Trades Training at the national level.

In 1984, due to space constraints, the Centre Forestier considered relocation options. The Lady Stable site, situated on the village's heights, was chosen, and discussions began with the Town Hall of La Bastide des Jourdans.

1985 marked the initiation of the Forest Center's first international endeavors in Quebec and the USA.

In 1990, with support from the region, state, industrial entities, and families, new wooden facilities were constructed, enabling the Forest Center to expand its core activities: school training, learning, ongoing vocational training, international initiatives, and close collaboration with the professional branch.

The Inter-Proof Interior Procance-Alpes-Côte d'Azur was formed in 1995, with the forest center's director elected as its President.

Following the passing of President Jean Clapier in 1997, Vice-President Antoine Gutierrez assumed the role.

In 1998, the United Nations' decision led to the Centre Forestier's selection to host an international seminar on forest training in the Bastide of the Ontdines. The event's outcome of the event was the establishment of the International Network of Trade Centers in the EduForest Forest Trade.

2005 - The Centre Forestier hosted the inaugural international congress for forest trade training centers.

In response to emerging needs, wood energy training programs were established in 2009.

In 2010, the European project "ConCert" added a new dimension to the Centre Forestier's international activities. The project aimed to certify the competencies of forest work entrepreneurs, providing a European certification in addition to vocational qualifications. Results were presented in 2011 during the 3rd international conference of forest training centers in Austria.

2013 - The Ministry of Agriculture announced a revival plan for the forest-wood sector. Two significant "wood energy" industrial projects were underway in the Provence-Alpes-Côte d'Azur region, offering promising prospects for additional jobs and training opportunities. International activities, apprenticeships, and qualified training were on the rise.

In 2014, the Centre Forestier initiated refurbishment of its heating network and launched an extension project using certified Alpine wood. The Center introduced the European "Chainsaw License" training program in France, with a recognized qualification certificate across all European countries.

June 2014 - The Centre Forestier hosted the 4th international conference for forest trade training centers in Germany.

2015 - Extensive refurbishment work using certified Alpine wood was undertaken on the Centre Forestier's facades. The Center acquired the first manual felling and manual branch-cutting simulator for training purposes. Still in 2015, the Centre Forestier's director was elected President of PEFC Provence-Alpes-Côte d'Azur, directly related to the forest sector's certification activities.

2016 - Building refurbishment was completed, and the Forest Center obtained the necessary construction permit for expansion. The new building, constructed with certified PEFC Alpine wood, included a heating plant using wood chips and a storage and drying shed, involving Center's learners in an experimental installation.

June 2016 - The Forest Center organized the 5th international conference for forest trade training centers in Spain. The next conference was scheduled for 2019.

In November 2016, the installation of a dedicated fiber optic line for the Forest Center (13 km) was completed, providing high-speed internet access beneficial for training purposes.

2017 - Construction commenced on the new building as the Forest Center expanded to better accommodate learners and prepare them for careers in the forestry sector. This year also marked the beginning of mobility for 4th-grade students, with a trip to Italy. The Forest Center introduced the "4th Nature and Success" class, focusing on the positive utilization of nature and forests within the educational framework.

== Location ==
The Centre Forestier is located within the heart of the Provence-Alpes-Côte d'Azur region between the Alps and the azure Mediterranean. It is situated in the southeast of the Luberon forest massif, encompassing an expanse of 21 hectares of verdant woodlands. Positioned at a distance of 35 kilometers northeast of Aix en Provence and of proximity to key arterial roads.
