= Forest Institute of Vallombrosa =

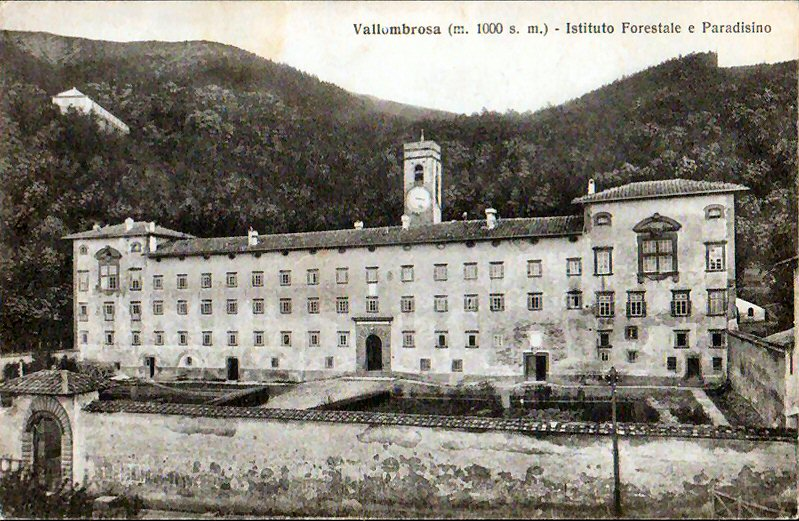

The Forest Institute of Vallombrosa or L’Istituto Forestale di Vallombrosa is a school of forestry founded in 1870 on the German model, the only one of its kind in Italy. It is sited in buildings belonging to Vallombrosa Abbey. It is believed that the selection of location was influenced by the movement of capital from Turin to Florence in 1865. Inspector General of Forests Adolfo de Bérenger was the first director of the institute. It was initially called as Royal Forestry Institute of Valle Ombrosa.
